

545001–545100 

|-bgcolor=#E9E9E9
| 545001 ||  || — || October 26, 2014 || Haleakala || Pan-STARRS ||  || align=right | 1.7 km || 
|-id=002 bgcolor=#E9E9E9
| 545002 ||  || — || May 7, 2007 || Kitt Peak || Spacewatch ||  || align=right | 2.6 km || 
|-id=003 bgcolor=#d6d6d6
| 545003 ||  || — || October 24, 2003 || Kitt Peak || Spacewatch ||  || align=right | 2.3 km || 
|-id=004 bgcolor=#E9E9E9
| 545004 ||  || — || July 16, 2013 || Haleakala || Pan-STARRS ||  || align=right data-sort-value="0.93" | 930 m || 
|-id=005 bgcolor=#d6d6d6
| 545005 ||  || — || April 2, 2011 || Mount Lemmon || Mount Lemmon Survey ||  || align=right | 2.3 km || 
|-id=006 bgcolor=#E9E9E9
| 545006 ||  || — || December 6, 2005 || Kitt Peak || Spacewatch ||  || align=right | 2.1 km || 
|-id=007 bgcolor=#d6d6d6
| 545007 ||  || — || October 10, 2008 || Mount Lemmon || Mount Lemmon Survey ||  || align=right | 2.4 km || 
|-id=008 bgcolor=#E9E9E9
| 545008 ||  || — || November 4, 2005 || Kitt Peak || Spacewatch ||  || align=right | 1.5 km || 
|-id=009 bgcolor=#d6d6d6
| 545009 ||  || — || November 27, 2014 || Haleakala || Pan-STARRS ||  || align=right | 2.7 km || 
|-id=010 bgcolor=#E9E9E9
| 545010 ||  || — || December 10, 2010 || Mount Lemmon || Mount Lemmon Survey ||  || align=right | 2.0 km || 
|-id=011 bgcolor=#E9E9E9
| 545011 ||  || — || November 10, 2005 || Kitt Peak || Spacewatch ||  || align=right | 1.7 km || 
|-id=012 bgcolor=#E9E9E9
| 545012 ||  || — || March 13, 2012 || Kitt Peak || Spacewatch ||  || align=right | 1.6 km || 
|-id=013 bgcolor=#E9E9E9
| 545013 ||  || — || December 21, 2005 || Kitt Peak || Spacewatch ||  || align=right | 2.2 km || 
|-id=014 bgcolor=#E9E9E9
| 545014 ||  || — || November 26, 2014 || Haleakala || Pan-STARRS ||  || align=right | 1.4 km || 
|-id=015 bgcolor=#d6d6d6
| 545015 ||  || — || November 24, 2014 || Haleakala || Pan-STARRS ||  || align=right | 2.5 km || 
|-id=016 bgcolor=#E9E9E9
| 545016 ||  || — || November 23, 2014 || Haleakala || Pan-STARRS ||  || align=right | 1.4 km || 
|-id=017 bgcolor=#E9E9E9
| 545017 ||  || — || November 6, 2010 || Mount Lemmon || Mount Lemmon Survey ||  || align=right | 1.2 km || 
|-id=018 bgcolor=#d6d6d6
| 545018 ||  || — || December 11, 2014 || Mount Lemmon || Mount Lemmon Survey ||  || align=right | 3.1 km || 
|-id=019 bgcolor=#d6d6d6
| 545019 ||  || — || September 14, 2013 || Haleakala || Pan-STARRS ||  || align=right | 2.8 km || 
|-id=020 bgcolor=#E9E9E9
| 545020 ||  || — || September 3, 2013 || Elena Remote || A. Oreshko ||  || align=right | 2.2 km || 
|-id=021 bgcolor=#E9E9E9
| 545021 ||  || — || December 10, 2010 || Mount Lemmon || Mount Lemmon Survey ||  || align=right | 1.9 km || 
|-id=022 bgcolor=#d6d6d6
| 545022 ||  || — || November 20, 2014 || Haleakala || Pan-STARRS ||  || align=right | 2.9 km || 
|-id=023 bgcolor=#E9E9E9
| 545023 ||  || — || September 29, 2005 || Kitt Peak || Spacewatch ||  || align=right | 1.5 km || 
|-id=024 bgcolor=#E9E9E9
| 545024 ||  || — || November 16, 2014 || Mount Lemmon || Mount Lemmon Survey ||  || align=right | 1.2 km || 
|-id=025 bgcolor=#E9E9E9
| 545025 ||  || — || November 22, 2006 || Mount Lemmon || Mount Lemmon Survey ||  || align=right | 1.0 km || 
|-id=026 bgcolor=#d6d6d6
| 545026 ||  || — || May 8, 2011 || Mount Lemmon || Mount Lemmon Survey ||  || align=right | 2.8 km || 
|-id=027 bgcolor=#E9E9E9
| 545027 ||  || — || December 15, 2014 || Mount Lemmon || Mount Lemmon Survey ||  || align=right | 2.6 km || 
|-id=028 bgcolor=#E9E9E9
| 545028 ||  || — || December 24, 2006 || Kitt Peak || Spacewatch ||  || align=right | 1.3 km || 
|-id=029 bgcolor=#fefefe
| 545029 ||  || — || November 20, 2014 || Mount Lemmon || Mount Lemmon Survey || H || align=right data-sort-value="0.56" | 560 m || 
|-id=030 bgcolor=#E9E9E9
| 545030 ||  || — || December 15, 2009 || Catalina || CSS ||  || align=right | 2.4 km || 
|-id=031 bgcolor=#d6d6d6
| 545031 ||  || — || January 19, 2004 || Kitt Peak || Spacewatch ||  || align=right | 2.5 km || 
|-id=032 bgcolor=#d6d6d6
| 545032 ||  || — || January 17, 2004 || Palomar || NEAT ||  || align=right | 3.3 km || 
|-id=033 bgcolor=#d6d6d6
| 545033 ||  || — || December 31, 2008 || Mount Lemmon || Mount Lemmon Survey ||  || align=right | 3.3 km || 
|-id=034 bgcolor=#d6d6d6
| 545034 ||  || — || December 1, 2014 || Haleakala || Pan-STARRS ||  || align=right | 3.0 km || 
|-id=035 bgcolor=#d6d6d6
| 545035 ||  || — || May 24, 2011 || Haleakala || Pan-STARRS ||  || align=right | 3.1 km || 
|-id=036 bgcolor=#d6d6d6
| 545036 ||  || — || March 13, 2011 || Kitt Peak || Spacewatch ||  || align=right | 2.2 km || 
|-id=037 bgcolor=#E9E9E9
| 545037 ||  || — || February 12, 2011 || Mount Lemmon || Mount Lemmon Survey ||  || align=right | 1.8 km || 
|-id=038 bgcolor=#d6d6d6
| 545038 ||  || — || November 6, 2008 || Mount Lemmon || Mount Lemmon Survey ||  || align=right | 2.6 km || 
|-id=039 bgcolor=#E9E9E9
| 545039 ||  || — || October 26, 2014 || 7300 || W. K. Y. Yeung ||  || align=right | 2.1 km || 
|-id=040 bgcolor=#fefefe
| 545040 ||  || — || April 19, 2013 || Mount Lemmon || Mount Lemmon Survey || H || align=right data-sort-value="0.64" | 640 m || 
|-id=041 bgcolor=#E9E9E9
| 545041 ||  || — || January 30, 2011 || Kitt Peak || Spacewatch ||  || align=right | 1.8 km || 
|-id=042 bgcolor=#d6d6d6
| 545042 ||  || — || July 14, 2013 || Haleakala || Pan-STARRS ||  || align=right | 2.4 km || 
|-id=043 bgcolor=#fefefe
| 545043 ||  || — || November 29, 2014 || Haleakala || Pan-STARRS || H || align=right data-sort-value="0.59" | 590 m || 
|-id=044 bgcolor=#E9E9E9
| 545044 ||  || — || November 10, 2014 || Haleakala || Pan-STARRS ||  || align=right | 1.6 km || 
|-id=045 bgcolor=#d6d6d6
| 545045 ||  || — || June 4, 2011 || Mount Lemmon || Mount Lemmon Survey ||  || align=right | 2.9 km || 
|-id=046 bgcolor=#d6d6d6
| 545046 ||  || — || January 15, 2010 || Kitt Peak || Spacewatch ||  || align=right | 2.0 km || 
|-id=047 bgcolor=#fefefe
| 545047 ||  || — || December 19, 2014 || Haleakala || Pan-STARRS || H || align=right data-sort-value="0.80" | 800 m || 
|-id=048 bgcolor=#d6d6d6
| 545048 ||  || — || March 11, 2005 || Kitt Peak || Spacewatch ||  || align=right | 1.9 km || 
|-id=049 bgcolor=#d6d6d6
| 545049 ||  || — || December 20, 2014 || ESA OGS || ESA OGS ||  || align=right | 2.8 km || 
|-id=050 bgcolor=#d6d6d6
| 545050 ||  || — || December 20, 2014 || Kitt Peak || Spacewatch ||  || align=right | 2.8 km || 
|-id=051 bgcolor=#d6d6d6
| 545051 ||  || — || August 29, 2013 || Haleakala || Pan-STARRS ||  || align=right | 3.0 km || 
|-id=052 bgcolor=#fefefe
| 545052 ||  || — || September 28, 2006 || Mount Lemmon || Mount Lemmon Survey ||  || align=right data-sort-value="0.62" | 620 m || 
|-id=053 bgcolor=#d6d6d6
| 545053 ||  || — || April 30, 2011 || Haleakala || Pan-STARRS ||  || align=right | 2.8 km || 
|-id=054 bgcolor=#d6d6d6
| 545054 ||  || — || September 26, 2008 || Kitt Peak || Spacewatch ||  || align=right | 2.9 km || 
|-id=055 bgcolor=#E9E9E9
| 545055 ||  || — || August 22, 2014 || Haleakala || Pan-STARRS ||  || align=right | 1.4 km || 
|-id=056 bgcolor=#d6d6d6
| 545056 ||  || — || April 13, 2004 || Palomar || NEAT || Tj (2.94) || align=right | 3.2 km || 
|-id=057 bgcolor=#d6d6d6
| 545057 ||  || — || November 26, 2013 || Haleakala || Pan-STARRS || Tj (2.9) || align=right | 3.9 km || 
|-id=058 bgcolor=#d6d6d6
| 545058 ||  || — || December 20, 2014 || Kitt Peak || Spacewatch ||  || align=right | 3.3 km || 
|-id=059 bgcolor=#d6d6d6
| 545059 ||  || — || November 23, 2014 || Mount Lemmon || Mount Lemmon Survey ||  || align=right | 2.4 km || 
|-id=060 bgcolor=#E9E9E9
| 545060 ||  || — || February 3, 2011 || Piszkesteto || Z. Kuli, K. Sárneczky ||  || align=right | 2.3 km || 
|-id=061 bgcolor=#E9E9E9
| 545061 ||  || — || April 16, 2013 || Haleakala || Pan-STARRS ||  || align=right | 1.4 km || 
|-id=062 bgcolor=#d6d6d6
| 545062 ||  || — || November 17, 2014 || Haleakala || Pan-STARRS ||  || align=right | 2.9 km || 
|-id=063 bgcolor=#E9E9E9
| 545063 ||  || — || October 14, 2010 || Mount Lemmon || Mount Lemmon Survey ||  || align=right | 1.7 km || 
|-id=064 bgcolor=#d6d6d6
| 545064 ||  || — || December 15, 2009 || Mount Lemmon || Mount Lemmon Survey ||  || align=right | 2.1 km || 
|-id=065 bgcolor=#E9E9E9
| 545065 ||  || — || October 16, 2009 || Mount Lemmon || Mount Lemmon Survey ||  || align=right | 1.3 km || 
|-id=066 bgcolor=#d6d6d6
| 545066 ||  || — || September 30, 1998 || Kitt Peak || Spacewatch ||  || align=right | 2.7 km || 
|-id=067 bgcolor=#d6d6d6
| 545067 ||  || — || September 18, 1998 || Kitt Peak || Spacewatch ||  || align=right | 3.6 km || 
|-id=068 bgcolor=#E9E9E9
| 545068 ||  || — || November 3, 2014 || Mount Lemmon || Mount Lemmon Survey ||  || align=right | 1.8 km || 
|-id=069 bgcolor=#d6d6d6
| 545069 ||  || — || April 14, 2011 || Mount Lemmon || Mount Lemmon Survey ||  || align=right | 2.0 km || 
|-id=070 bgcolor=#E9E9E9
| 545070 ||  || — || April 29, 1998 || Kitt Peak || Spacewatch ||  || align=right | 2.0 km || 
|-id=071 bgcolor=#d6d6d6
| 545071 ||  || — || November 18, 2014 || Mount Lemmon || Mount Lemmon Survey ||  || align=right | 3.0 km || 
|-id=072 bgcolor=#d6d6d6
| 545072 ||  || — || September 5, 2008 || Kitt Peak || Spacewatch ||  || align=right | 2.0 km || 
|-id=073 bgcolor=#d6d6d6
| 545073 ||  || — || August 12, 2013 || Haleakala || Pan-STARRS ||  || align=right | 2.7 km || 
|-id=074 bgcolor=#d6d6d6
| 545074 ||  || — || October 5, 2003 || Kitt Peak || Spacewatch ||  || align=right | 3.5 km || 
|-id=075 bgcolor=#d6d6d6
| 545075 ||  || — || January 8, 2010 || Mount Lemmon || Mount Lemmon Survey ||  || align=right | 2.9 km || 
|-id=076 bgcolor=#E9E9E9
| 545076 ||  || — || November 5, 2010 || Mount Lemmon || Mount Lemmon Survey ||  || align=right data-sort-value="0.89" | 890 m || 
|-id=077 bgcolor=#fefefe
| 545077 ||  || — || December 10, 2014 || Mount Lemmon || Mount Lemmon Survey || H || align=right data-sort-value="0.75" | 750 m || 
|-id=078 bgcolor=#E9E9E9
| 545078 ||  || — || November 17, 2010 || Mount Lemmon || Mount Lemmon Survey ||  || align=right | 1.5 km || 
|-id=079 bgcolor=#d6d6d6
| 545079 ||  || — || December 24, 2014 || Mount Lemmon || Mount Lemmon Survey ||  || align=right | 2.8 km || 
|-id=080 bgcolor=#d6d6d6
| 545080 ||  || — || November 21, 2009 || Mount Lemmon || Mount Lemmon Survey ||  || align=right | 3.9 km || 
|-id=081 bgcolor=#E9E9E9
| 545081 ||  || — || December 30, 2005 || Mount Lemmon || Mount Lemmon Survey ||  || align=right | 1.4 km || 
|-id=082 bgcolor=#E9E9E9
| 545082 ||  || — || October 27, 2009 || Mount Lemmon || Mount Lemmon Survey ||  || align=right | 2.1 km || 
|-id=083 bgcolor=#d6d6d6
| 545083 ||  || — || December 24, 2014 || Mount Lemmon || Mount Lemmon Survey ||  || align=right | 2.9 km || 
|-id=084 bgcolor=#fefefe
| 545084 ||  || — || May 28, 2008 || Mount Lemmon || Mount Lemmon Survey || H || align=right data-sort-value="0.81" | 810 m || 
|-id=085 bgcolor=#d6d6d6
| 545085 ||  || — || December 22, 2003 || Kitt Peak || Spacewatch ||  || align=right | 3.4 km || 
|-id=086 bgcolor=#d6d6d6
| 545086 ||  || — || November 1, 2008 || Mount Lemmon || Mount Lemmon Survey ||  || align=right | 2.3 km || 
|-id=087 bgcolor=#E9E9E9
| 545087 ||  || — || February 1, 2003 || Palomar || NEAT ||  || align=right | 1.5 km || 
|-id=088 bgcolor=#d6d6d6
| 545088 ||  || — || September 13, 2013 || Kitt Peak || Spacewatch ||  || align=right | 2.3 km || 
|-id=089 bgcolor=#d6d6d6
| 545089 ||  || — || November 15, 2003 || Kitt Peak || Spacewatch ||  || align=right | 2.2 km || 
|-id=090 bgcolor=#d6d6d6
| 545090 ||  || — || August 23, 2003 || Palomar || NEAT ||  || align=right | 2.8 km || 
|-id=091 bgcolor=#fefefe
| 545091 ||  || — || November 20, 2014 || Mount Lemmon || Mount Lemmon Survey || H || align=right data-sort-value="0.86" | 860 m || 
|-id=092 bgcolor=#E9E9E9
| 545092 ||  || — || March 29, 2012 || Haleakala || Pan-STARRS ||  || align=right | 1.4 km || 
|-id=093 bgcolor=#E9E9E9
| 545093 ||  || — || November 26, 2014 || Haleakala || Pan-STARRS ||  || align=right | 1.1 km || 
|-id=094 bgcolor=#d6d6d6
| 545094 ||  || — || September 10, 2007 || Mount Lemmon || Mount Lemmon Survey ||  || align=right | 2.8 km || 
|-id=095 bgcolor=#E9E9E9
| 545095 ||  || — || September 3, 2013 || Calar Alto || F. Hormuth ||  || align=right | 1.8 km || 
|-id=096 bgcolor=#d6d6d6
| 545096 ||  || — || January 7, 2005 || Catalina || CSS ||  || align=right | 2.8 km || 
|-id=097 bgcolor=#E9E9E9
| 545097 ||  || — || December 14, 2010 || Mount Lemmon || Mount Lemmon Survey ||  || align=right | 2.0 km || 
|-id=098 bgcolor=#fefefe
| 545098 ||  || — || December 27, 2014 || Mount Lemmon || Mount Lemmon Survey || H || align=right data-sort-value="0.71" | 710 m || 
|-id=099 bgcolor=#fefefe
| 545099 ||  || — || December 3, 2014 || Haleakala || Pan-STARRS || H || align=right data-sort-value="0.71" | 710 m || 
|-id=100 bgcolor=#d6d6d6
| 545100 ||  || — || January 17, 2005 || Kitt Peak || Spacewatch ||  || align=right | 3.1 km || 
|}

545101–545200 

|-bgcolor=#E9E9E9
| 545101 ||  || — || December 27, 2014 || Haleakala || Pan-STARRS ||  || align=right | 1.2 km || 
|-id=102 bgcolor=#d6d6d6
| 545102 ||  || — || December 11, 2014 || Mount Lemmon || Mount Lemmon Survey ||  || align=right | 2.3 km || 
|-id=103 bgcolor=#d6d6d6
| 545103 ||  || — || August 14, 2013 || Haleakala || Pan-STARRS ||  || align=right | 2.6 km || 
|-id=104 bgcolor=#E9E9E9
| 545104 ||  || — || March 2, 2011 || Catalina || CSS ||  || align=right | 2.3 km || 
|-id=105 bgcolor=#d6d6d6
| 545105 ||  || — || August 14, 2013 || Haleakala || Pan-STARRS ||  || align=right | 2.7 km || 
|-id=106 bgcolor=#d6d6d6
| 545106 ||  || — || September 18, 2014 || Haleakala || Pan-STARRS ||  || align=right | 2.2 km || 
|-id=107 bgcolor=#E9E9E9
| 545107 ||  || — || September 24, 2009 || Kitt Peak || Spacewatch ||  || align=right | 1.8 km || 
|-id=108 bgcolor=#d6d6d6
| 545108 ||  || — || January 13, 2005 || Kitt Peak || Spacewatch ||  || align=right | 3.0 km || 
|-id=109 bgcolor=#E9E9E9
| 545109 ||  || — || March 11, 2011 || Kitt Peak || Spacewatch ||  || align=right | 2.2 km || 
|-id=110 bgcolor=#d6d6d6
| 545110 ||  || — || October 20, 2008 || Kitt Peak || Spacewatch ||  || align=right | 3.3 km || 
|-id=111 bgcolor=#fefefe
| 545111 ||  || — || November 1, 2011 || Kitt Peak || Spacewatch || H || align=right data-sort-value="0.62" | 620 m || 
|-id=112 bgcolor=#fefefe
| 545112 ||  || — || November 24, 2003 || Kitt Peak || Spacewatch || H || align=right data-sort-value="0.65" | 650 m || 
|-id=113 bgcolor=#fefefe
| 545113 ||  || — || November 28, 2014 || Haleakala || Pan-STARRS || H || align=right data-sort-value="0.71" | 710 m || 
|-id=114 bgcolor=#fefefe
| 545114 ||  || — || December 27, 2014 || Haleakala || Pan-STARRS || H || align=right data-sort-value="0.76" | 760 m || 
|-id=115 bgcolor=#d6d6d6
| 545115 ||  || — || December 29, 2014 || Haleakala || Pan-STARRS ||  || align=right | 2.5 km || 
|-id=116 bgcolor=#d6d6d6
| 545116 ||  || — || April 15, 2004 || Palomar || NEAT ||  || align=right | 2.6 km || 
|-id=117 bgcolor=#d6d6d6
| 545117 ||  || — || December 21, 2008 || Kitt Peak || Spacewatch ||  || align=right | 2.6 km || 
|-id=118 bgcolor=#d6d6d6
| 545118 ||  || — || December 26, 2008 || Nyukasa || H. Kurosaki, A. Nakajima ||  || align=right | 2.8 km || 
|-id=119 bgcolor=#d6d6d6
| 545119 ||  || — || October 23, 2008 || Mount Lemmon || Mount Lemmon Survey ||  || align=right | 1.9 km || 
|-id=120 bgcolor=#d6d6d6
| 545120 ||  || — || December 26, 2014 || Haleakala || Pan-STARRS ||  || align=right | 2.4 km || 
|-id=121 bgcolor=#E9E9E9
| 545121 ||  || — || September 27, 2000 || Kitt Peak || Spacewatch ||  || align=right | 1.8 km || 
|-id=122 bgcolor=#E9E9E9
| 545122 ||  || — || November 20, 2014 || Mount Lemmon || Mount Lemmon Survey ||  || align=right | 1.6 km || 
|-id=123 bgcolor=#d6d6d6
| 545123 ||  || — || September 6, 2008 || Kitt Peak || Spacewatch ||  || align=right | 2.1 km || 
|-id=124 bgcolor=#d6d6d6
| 545124 ||  || — || September 14, 2013 || Mount Lemmon || Mount Lemmon Survey ||  || align=right | 2.4 km || 
|-id=125 bgcolor=#d6d6d6
| 545125 ||  || — || December 18, 2014 || Haleakala || Pan-STARRS ||  || align=right | 2.2 km || 
|-id=126 bgcolor=#d6d6d6
| 545126 ||  || — || October 2, 2013 || Haleakala || Pan-STARRS ||  || align=right | 1.8 km || 
|-id=127 bgcolor=#d6d6d6
| 545127 ||  || — || December 25, 2014 || Haleakala || Pan-STARRS ||  || align=right | 2.7 km || 
|-id=128 bgcolor=#d6d6d6
| 545128 ||  || — || December 29, 2014 || Haleakala || Pan-STARRS ||  || align=right | 2.6 km || 
|-id=129 bgcolor=#d6d6d6
| 545129 ||  || — || October 6, 2013 || Oukaimeden || C. Rinner ||  || align=right | 2.9 km || 
|-id=130 bgcolor=#d6d6d6
| 545130 ||  || — || October 13, 2013 || Mount Lemmon || Mount Lemmon Survey ||  || align=right | 2.8 km || 
|-id=131 bgcolor=#d6d6d6
| 545131 ||  || — || February 18, 2010 || Kitt Peak || Spacewatch ||  || align=right | 2.4 km || 
|-id=132 bgcolor=#d6d6d6
| 545132 ||  || — || October 9, 2007 || Kitt Peak || Spacewatch ||  || align=right | 2.3 km || 
|-id=133 bgcolor=#d6d6d6
| 545133 ||  || — || December 29, 2014 || Haleakala || Pan-STARRS ||  || align=right | 2.4 km || 
|-id=134 bgcolor=#fefefe
| 545134 ||  || — || November 20, 2008 || Mount Lemmon || Mount Lemmon Survey || H || align=right data-sort-value="0.71" | 710 m || 
|-id=135 bgcolor=#E9E9E9
| 545135 ||  || — || December 21, 2014 || Mount Lemmon || Mount Lemmon Survey ||  || align=right | 1.5 km || 
|-id=136 bgcolor=#E9E9E9
| 545136 ||  || — || November 15, 2010 || Mount Lemmon || Mount Lemmon Survey || EUN || align=right | 1.0 km || 
|-id=137 bgcolor=#fefefe
| 545137 ||  || — || November 3, 2010 || Mount Lemmon || Mount Lemmon Survey ||  || align=right data-sort-value="0.89" | 890 m || 
|-id=138 bgcolor=#E9E9E9
| 545138 ||  || — || January 8, 2011 || Mount Lemmon || Mount Lemmon Survey ||  || align=right | 1.2 km || 
|-id=139 bgcolor=#E9E9E9
| 545139 ||  || — || February 22, 2002 || Palomar || NEAT || JUN || align=right | 1.3 km || 
|-id=140 bgcolor=#E9E9E9
| 545140 ||  || — || March 10, 2003 || Palomar || NEAT ||  || align=right data-sort-value="0.86" | 860 m || 
|-id=141 bgcolor=#E9E9E9
| 545141 ||  || — || January 14, 2011 || Mount Lemmon || Mount Lemmon Survey ||  || align=right data-sort-value="0.91" | 910 m || 
|-id=142 bgcolor=#E9E9E9
| 545142 ||  || — || January 13, 2011 || Catalina || CSS ||  || align=right | 2.0 km || 
|-id=143 bgcolor=#E9E9E9
| 545143 ||  || — || September 30, 2009 || Mount Lemmon || Mount Lemmon Survey ||  || align=right | 1.8 km || 
|-id=144 bgcolor=#E9E9E9
| 545144 ||  || — || February 5, 2011 || Catalina || CSS ||  || align=right | 1.8 km || 
|-id=145 bgcolor=#fefefe
| 545145 ||  || — || March 24, 2012 || Kitt Peak || Spacewatch ||  || align=right data-sort-value="0.88" | 880 m || 
|-id=146 bgcolor=#E9E9E9
| 545146 ||  || — || October 4, 2013 || Catalina || CSS ||  || align=right | 1.6 km || 
|-id=147 bgcolor=#E9E9E9
| 545147 ||  || — || January 13, 2011 || Kitt Peak || Spacewatch ||  || align=right data-sort-value="0.85" | 850 m || 
|-id=148 bgcolor=#E9E9E9
| 545148 ||  || — || September 19, 2014 || Haleakala || Pan-STARRS ||  || align=right | 1.1 km || 
|-id=149 bgcolor=#E9E9E9
| 545149 ||  || — || January 10, 2011 || Mount Lemmon || Mount Lemmon Survey ||  || align=right | 1.0 km || 
|-id=150 bgcolor=#d6d6d6
| 545150 ||  || — || December 29, 2011 || Mount Lemmon || Mount Lemmon Survey ||  || align=right | 2.6 km || 
|-id=151 bgcolor=#d6d6d6
| 545151 ||  || — || May 12, 2013 || Haleakala || Pan-STARRS || 7:4 || align=right | 3.2 km || 
|-id=152 bgcolor=#d6d6d6
| 545152 ||  || — || January 4, 2011 || Mount Lemmon || Mount Lemmon Survey || 3:2 || align=right | 3.7 km || 
|-id=153 bgcolor=#d6d6d6
| 545153 ||  || — || October 28, 2017 || Haleakala || Pan-STARRS || 3:2 || align=right | 3.5 km || 
|-id=154 bgcolor=#E9E9E9
| 545154 ||  || — || January 10, 2011 || Catalina || CSS ||  || align=right | 1.6 km || 
|-id=155 bgcolor=#E9E9E9
| 545155 ||  || — || December 3, 2010 || Mount Lemmon || Mount Lemmon Survey ||  || align=right data-sort-value="0.96" | 960 m || 
|-id=156 bgcolor=#E9E9E9
| 545156 ||  || — || March 20, 2007 || Catalina || CSS ||  || align=right | 1.4 km || 
|-id=157 bgcolor=#E9E9E9
| 545157 ||  || — || March 23, 2003 || Kitt Peak || Spacewatch ||  || align=right | 1.3 km || 
|-id=158 bgcolor=#E9E9E9
| 545158 ||  || — || December 15, 2006 || Kitt Peak || Spacewatch ||  || align=right | 1.0 km || 
|-id=159 bgcolor=#E9E9E9
| 545159 ||  || — || January 24, 2011 || Mount Lemmon || Mount Lemmon Survey ||  || align=right | 1.1 km || 
|-id=160 bgcolor=#E9E9E9
| 545160 ||  || — || September 12, 2004 || Kitt Peak || Spacewatch ||  || align=right | 1.2 km || 
|-id=161 bgcolor=#E9E9E9
| 545161 ||  || — || January 29, 2007 || Kitt Peak || Spacewatch ||  || align=right | 1.1 km || 
|-id=162 bgcolor=#E9E9E9
| 545162 ||  || — || April 23, 2007 || Catalina || CSS ||  || align=right | 1.7 km || 
|-id=163 bgcolor=#fefefe
| 545163 ||  || — || January 24, 2011 || Mount Lemmon || Mount Lemmon Survey ||  || align=right | 1.2 km || 
|-id=164 bgcolor=#E9E9E9
| 545164 ||  || — || February 4, 2003 || Palomar || NEAT ||  || align=right | 1.4 km || 
|-id=165 bgcolor=#E9E9E9
| 545165 ||  || — || January 28, 2011 || Sandlot || G. Hug ||  || align=right data-sort-value="0.84" | 840 m || 
|-id=166 bgcolor=#d6d6d6
| 545166 ||  || — || January 28, 2011 || Haleakala || Pan-STARRS || Tj (2.93) || align=right | 3.4 km || 
|-id=167 bgcolor=#E9E9E9
| 545167 Bonfini ||  ||  || January 30, 2011 || Piszkesteto || K. Sárneczky, S. Kürti ||  || align=right data-sort-value="0.71" | 710 m || 
|-id=168 bgcolor=#E9E9E9
| 545168 ||  || — || November 1, 2005 || Kitt Peak || Spacewatch ||  || align=right data-sort-value="0.89" | 890 m || 
|-id=169 bgcolor=#E9E9E9
| 545169 ||  || — || January 30, 2011 || Piszkesteto || Z. Kuli, K. Sárneczky ||  || align=right | 1.7 km || 
|-id=170 bgcolor=#E9E9E9
| 545170 ||  || — || January 30, 2011 || Piszkesteto || Z. Kuli, K. Sárneczky ||  || align=right data-sort-value="0.96" | 960 m || 
|-id=171 bgcolor=#fefefe
| 545171 ||  || — || January 29, 2011 || Kachina || J. Hobart || H || align=right data-sort-value="0.73" | 730 m || 
|-id=172 bgcolor=#E9E9E9
| 545172 ||  || — || April 9, 2003 || Palomar || NEAT ||  || align=right data-sort-value="0.83" | 830 m || 
|-id=173 bgcolor=#E9E9E9
| 545173 ||  || — || January 30, 2011 || Mount Lemmon || Mount Lemmon Survey ||  || align=right data-sort-value="0.88" | 880 m || 
|-id=174 bgcolor=#E9E9E9
| 545174 ||  || — || January 25, 2011 || Mount Lemmon || Mount Lemmon Survey ||  || align=right data-sort-value="0.77" | 770 m || 
|-id=175 bgcolor=#E9E9E9
| 545175 ||  || — || January 4, 2011 || Mount Lemmon || Mount Lemmon Survey ||  || align=right data-sort-value="0.84" | 840 m || 
|-id=176 bgcolor=#d6d6d6
| 545176 ||  || — || January 28, 2011 || Kitt Peak || Spacewatch || 3:2 || align=right | 3.7 km || 
|-id=177 bgcolor=#E9E9E9
| 545177 ||  || — || February 1, 2011 || Piszkesteto || Z. Kuli, K. Sárneczky ||  || align=right data-sort-value="0.83" | 830 m || 
|-id=178 bgcolor=#E9E9E9
| 545178 ||  || — || January 15, 2015 || Haleakala || Pan-STARRS ||  || align=right | 1.0 km || 
|-id=179 bgcolor=#E9E9E9
| 545179 ||  || — || January 15, 2015 || Haleakala || Pan-STARRS ||  || align=right | 1.00 km || 
|-id=180 bgcolor=#E9E9E9
| 545180 ||  || — || August 11, 2004 || Campo Imperatore || CINEOS ||  || align=right data-sort-value="0.87" | 870 m || 
|-id=181 bgcolor=#E9E9E9
| 545181 ||  || — || January 27, 2011 || Kitt Peak || Spacewatch ||  || align=right data-sort-value="0.89" | 890 m || 
|-id=182 bgcolor=#E9E9E9
| 545182 ||  || — || January 27, 2011 || Kitt Peak || Spacewatch ||  || align=right | 1.4 km || 
|-id=183 bgcolor=#E9E9E9
| 545183 ||  || — || January 10, 2011 || Mount Lemmon || Mount Lemmon Survey ||  || align=right | 1.4 km || 
|-id=184 bgcolor=#E9E9E9
| 545184 ||  || — || September 3, 2005 || Palomar || NEAT ||  || align=right | 1.4 km || 
|-id=185 bgcolor=#E9E9E9
| 545185 ||  || — || January 27, 2011 || Mount Lemmon || Mount Lemmon Survey ||  || align=right | 1.3 km || 
|-id=186 bgcolor=#E9E9E9
| 545186 ||  || — || January 14, 2011 || Kitt Peak || Spacewatch ||  || align=right | 1.2 km || 
|-id=187 bgcolor=#E9E9E9
| 545187 ||  || — || April 1, 2003 || Kitt Peak || M. W. Buie, A. B. Jordan ||  || align=right | 1.8 km || 
|-id=188 bgcolor=#E9E9E9
| 545188 ||  || — || March 11, 2011 || Catalina || CSS ||  || align=right | 1.1 km || 
|-id=189 bgcolor=#E9E9E9
| 545189 ||  || — || August 31, 2005 || Palomar || NEAT ||  || align=right | 1.5 km || 
|-id=190 bgcolor=#E9E9E9
| 545190 ||  || — || January 27, 2011 || Mount Lemmon || Mount Lemmon Survey ||  || align=right | 1.3 km || 
|-id=191 bgcolor=#E9E9E9
| 545191 ||  || — || January 28, 2011 || Mount Lemmon || Mount Lemmon Survey ||  || align=right data-sort-value="0.83" | 830 m || 
|-id=192 bgcolor=#E9E9E9
| 545192 ||  || — || August 25, 2004 || Kitt Peak || Spacewatch ||  || align=right | 1.4 km || 
|-id=193 bgcolor=#E9E9E9
| 545193 ||  || — || January 29, 2011 || Mount Lemmon || Mount Lemmon Survey ||  || align=right data-sort-value="0.76" | 760 m || 
|-id=194 bgcolor=#E9E9E9
| 545194 ||  || — || January 29, 2011 || Mount Lemmon || Mount Lemmon Survey ||  || align=right data-sort-value="0.79" | 790 m || 
|-id=195 bgcolor=#E9E9E9
| 545195 ||  || — || January 28, 2011 || Mount Lemmon || Mount Lemmon Survey ||  || align=right data-sort-value="0.85" | 850 m || 
|-id=196 bgcolor=#E9E9E9
| 545196 ||  || — || April 5, 2003 || Kitt Peak || Spacewatch ||  || align=right | 1.2 km || 
|-id=197 bgcolor=#E9E9E9
| 545197 ||  || — || March 12, 2007 || Mount Lemmon || Mount Lemmon Survey ||  || align=right | 1.3 km || 
|-id=198 bgcolor=#E9E9E9
| 545198 ||  || — || April 1, 2016 || Haleakala || Pan-STARRS ||  || align=right | 1.2 km || 
|-id=199 bgcolor=#E9E9E9
| 545199 ||  || — || October 25, 2013 || Mount Lemmon || Mount Lemmon Survey ||  || align=right data-sort-value="0.81" | 810 m || 
|-id=200 bgcolor=#E9E9E9
| 545200 ||  || — || May 21, 2012 || Haleakala || Pan-STARRS ||  || align=right data-sort-value="0.75" | 750 m || 
|}

545201–545300 

|-bgcolor=#E9E9E9
| 545201 ||  || — || August 14, 2013 || Haleakala || Pan-STARRS ||  || align=right data-sort-value="0.73" | 730 m || 
|-id=202 bgcolor=#E9E9E9
| 545202 ||  || — || October 2, 2013 || Mount Lemmon || Mount Lemmon Survey ||  || align=right | 1.1 km || 
|-id=203 bgcolor=#E9E9E9
| 545203 ||  || — || November 28, 2014 || Mount Lemmon || Mount Lemmon Survey ||  || align=right | 1.5 km || 
|-id=204 bgcolor=#E9E9E9
| 545204 ||  || — || January 30, 2011 || Mount Lemmon || Mount Lemmon Survey ||  || align=right data-sort-value="0.81" | 810 m || 
|-id=205 bgcolor=#E9E9E9
| 545205 ||  || — || June 25, 2017 || Haleakala || Pan-STARRS ||  || align=right | 1.5 km || 
|-id=206 bgcolor=#fefefe
| 545206 ||  || — || September 5, 2013 || Kitt Peak || Spacewatch ||  || align=right data-sort-value="0.71" | 710 m || 
|-id=207 bgcolor=#E9E9E9
| 545207 ||  || — || November 16, 2010 || Mount Lemmon || Mount Lemmon Survey ||  || align=right | 1.2 km || 
|-id=208 bgcolor=#E9E9E9
| 545208 ||  || — || October 18, 2009 || Sandlot || G. Hug ||  || align=right | 2.1 km || 
|-id=209 bgcolor=#E9E9E9
| 545209 ||  || — || January 27, 2007 || Kitt Peak || Spacewatch ||  || align=right data-sort-value="0.97" | 970 m || 
|-id=210 bgcolor=#E9E9E9
| 545210 ||  || — || February 5, 2011 || Mount Lemmon || Mount Lemmon Survey ||  || align=right data-sort-value="0.75" | 750 m || 
|-id=211 bgcolor=#E9E9E9
| 545211 ||  || — || January 16, 2011 || Mount Lemmon || Mount Lemmon Survey ||  || align=right | 1.5 km || 
|-id=212 bgcolor=#d6d6d6
| 545212 ||  || — || December 10, 2009 || Mount Lemmon || Mount Lemmon Survey || 3:2 || align=right | 3.7 km || 
|-id=213 bgcolor=#E9E9E9
| 545213 ||  || — || January 30, 2011 || Mayhill-ISON || L. Elenin ||  || align=right | 1.3 km || 
|-id=214 bgcolor=#E9E9E9
| 545214 ||  || — || February 5, 2011 || Catalina || CSS ||  || align=right | 1.6 km || 
|-id=215 bgcolor=#E9E9E9
| 545215 ||  || — || December 10, 2010 || Mount Lemmon || Mount Lemmon Survey ||  || align=right | 1.4 km || 
|-id=216 bgcolor=#E9E9E9
| 545216 ||  || — || July 29, 2000 || Cerro Tololo || M. W. Buie, S. D. Kern ||  || align=right data-sort-value="0.87" | 870 m || 
|-id=217 bgcolor=#E9E9E9
| 545217 ||  || — || August 28, 2009 || Kitt Peak || Spacewatch ||  || align=right data-sort-value="0.81" | 810 m || 
|-id=218 bgcolor=#E9E9E9
| 545218 ||  || — || February 4, 2011 || Catalina || CSS ||  || align=right | 1.6 km || 
|-id=219 bgcolor=#FA8072
| 545219 ||  || — || January 15, 2011 || Mount Lemmon || Mount Lemmon Survey ||  || align=right data-sort-value="0.45" | 450 m || 
|-id=220 bgcolor=#E9E9E9
| 545220 ||  || — || March 9, 2003 || Palomar || NEAT ||  || align=right | 1.7 km || 
|-id=221 bgcolor=#E9E9E9
| 545221 ||  || — || January 28, 2011 || Mount Lemmon || Mount Lemmon Survey ||  || align=right data-sort-value="0.85" | 850 m || 
|-id=222 bgcolor=#E9E9E9
| 545222 ||  || — || January 28, 2011 || Mount Lemmon || Mount Lemmon Survey ||  || align=right | 1.1 km || 
|-id=223 bgcolor=#E9E9E9
| 545223 ||  || — || September 19, 2009 || Mount Lemmon || Mount Lemmon Survey ||  || align=right | 1.6 km || 
|-id=224 bgcolor=#E9E9E9
| 545224 ||  || — || February 1, 2003 || Palomar || NEAT ||  || align=right | 1.0 km || 
|-id=225 bgcolor=#E9E9E9
| 545225 ||  || — || January 27, 2011 || Kitt Peak || Spacewatch ||  || align=right | 1.2 km || 
|-id=226 bgcolor=#E9E9E9
| 545226 ||  || — || February 9, 2011 || Dauban || C. Rinner, F. Kugel ||  || align=right | 1.6 km || 
|-id=227 bgcolor=#E9E9E9
| 545227 ||  || — || February 10, 2011 || Catalina || CSS ||  || align=right | 1.9 km || 
|-id=228 bgcolor=#E9E9E9
| 545228 ||  || — || February 8, 2011 || Dauban || C. Rinner, F. Kugel ||  || align=right | 1.5 km || 
|-id=229 bgcolor=#E9E9E9
| 545229 ||  || — || October 14, 2009 || Mount Lemmon || Mount Lemmon Survey ||  || align=right data-sort-value="0.88" | 880 m || 
|-id=230 bgcolor=#E9E9E9
| 545230 ||  || — || November 5, 2005 || Kitt Peak || Spacewatch ||  || align=right | 1.3 km || 
|-id=231 bgcolor=#E9E9E9
| 545231 ||  || — || April 16, 2007 || Mount Lemmon || Mount Lemmon Survey ||  || align=right | 1.1 km || 
|-id=232 bgcolor=#E9E9E9
| 545232 ||  || — || March 26, 2003 || Palomar || NEAT ||  || align=right | 1.7 km || 
|-id=233 bgcolor=#E9E9E9
| 545233 ||  || — || March 16, 2016 || Haleakala || Pan-STARRS ||  || align=right data-sort-value="0.88" | 880 m || 
|-id=234 bgcolor=#E9E9E9
| 545234 ||  || — || September 24, 1960 || Palomar Mountain || T. Gehrels ||  || align=right | 1.0 km || 
|-id=235 bgcolor=#E9E9E9
| 545235 ||  || — || April 27, 2012 || Kitt Peak || Spacewatch ||  || align=right | 1.1 km || 
|-id=236 bgcolor=#E9E9E9
| 545236 ||  || — || February 22, 2011 || Kitt Peak || Spacewatch ||  || align=right data-sort-value="0.92" | 920 m || 
|-id=237 bgcolor=#E9E9E9
| 545237 ||  || — || February 22, 2011 || Kitt Peak || Spacewatch ||  || align=right | 1.3 km || 
|-id=238 bgcolor=#E9E9E9
| 545238 ||  || — || January 26, 2011 || Catalina || CSS ||  || align=right | 1.6 km || 
|-id=239 bgcolor=#E9E9E9
| 545239 ||  || — || January 16, 2011 || Mount Lemmon || Mount Lemmon Survey ||  || align=right | 2.9 km || 
|-id=240 bgcolor=#E9E9E9
| 545240 ||  || — || February 23, 2011 || Catalina || CSS ||  || align=right | 2.5 km || 
|-id=241 bgcolor=#E9E9E9
| 545241 ||  || — || February 10, 2011 || Mount Lemmon || Mount Lemmon Survey ||  || align=right | 1.3 km || 
|-id=242 bgcolor=#E9E9E9
| 545242 ||  || — || January 15, 2011 || Mount Lemmon || Mount Lemmon Survey ||  || align=right | 1.1 km || 
|-id=243 bgcolor=#E9E9E9
| 545243 ||  || — || November 6, 2005 || Mount Lemmon || Mount Lemmon Survey ||  || align=right | 1.3 km || 
|-id=244 bgcolor=#E9E9E9
| 545244 ||  || — || February 25, 2011 || Mount Lemmon || Mount Lemmon Survey ||  || align=right | 1.4 km || 
|-id=245 bgcolor=#E9E9E9
| 545245 ||  || — || February 26, 2011 || Mount Lemmon || Mount Lemmon Survey ||  || align=right | 1.4 km || 
|-id=246 bgcolor=#E9E9E9
| 545246 ||  || — || November 10, 2013 || Kitt Peak || Spacewatch ||  || align=right data-sort-value="0.97" | 970 m || 
|-id=247 bgcolor=#E9E9E9
| 545247 ||  || — || February 25, 2011 || Kitt Peak || Spacewatch ||  || align=right | 1.1 km || 
|-id=248 bgcolor=#E9E9E9
| 545248 ||  || — || January 28, 2007 || Kitt Peak || Spacewatch ||  || align=right | 1.4 km || 
|-id=249 bgcolor=#E9E9E9
| 545249 ||  || — || January 30, 2011 || Kitt Peak || Spacewatch ||  || align=right | 1.3 km || 
|-id=250 bgcolor=#E9E9E9
| 545250 ||  || — || February 9, 2011 || Mount Lemmon || Mount Lemmon Survey ||  || align=right | 1.3 km || 
|-id=251 bgcolor=#E9E9E9
| 545251 ||  || — || April 9, 2003 || Palomar || NEAT ||  || align=right | 1.7 km || 
|-id=252 bgcolor=#E9E9E9
| 545252 ||  || — || March 2, 2011 || Bergisch Gladbach || W. Bickel ||  || align=right | 1.4 km || 
|-id=253 bgcolor=#E9E9E9
| 545253 ||  || — || August 31, 2005 || Palomar || NEAT ||  || align=right | 1.1 km || 
|-id=254 bgcolor=#E9E9E9
| 545254 ||  || — || March 6, 2011 || Wildberg || R. Apitzsch ||  || align=right | 1.3 km || 
|-id=255 bgcolor=#E9E9E9
| 545255 ||  || — || May 5, 2002 || Palomar || NEAT ||  || align=right | 2.0 km || 
|-id=256 bgcolor=#E9E9E9
| 545256 ||  || — || September 4, 2000 || Terskol || Terskol Obs. ||  || align=right | 1.4 km || 
|-id=257 bgcolor=#E9E9E9
| 545257 ||  || — || March 1, 2011 || Mayhill-ISON || L. Elenin ||  || align=right | 1.4 km || 
|-id=258 bgcolor=#E9E9E9
| 545258 ||  || — || March 13, 2007 || Kitt Peak || Spacewatch ||  || align=right | 1.6 km || 
|-id=259 bgcolor=#E9E9E9
| 545259 ||  || — || February 22, 2011 || Kitt Peak || Spacewatch ||  || align=right | 1.1 km || 
|-id=260 bgcolor=#E9E9E9
| 545260 ||  || — || March 9, 2007 || Mount Lemmon || Mount Lemmon Survey ||  || align=right data-sort-value="0.97" | 970 m || 
|-id=261 bgcolor=#E9E9E9
| 545261 ||  || — || May 13, 2007 || Kitt Peak || Spacewatch ||  || align=right | 1.0 km || 
|-id=262 bgcolor=#E9E9E9
| 545262 ||  || — || February 25, 2011 || Kitt Peak || Spacewatch ||  || align=right | 1.3 km || 
|-id=263 bgcolor=#E9E9E9
| 545263 ||  || — || February 22, 2011 || Kitt Peak || Spacewatch ||  || align=right | 1.5 km || 
|-id=264 bgcolor=#E9E9E9
| 545264 ||  || — || March 2, 2011 || Kitt Peak || Spacewatch ||  || align=right | 1.3 km || 
|-id=265 bgcolor=#E9E9E9
| 545265 ||  || — || April 4, 2002 || Haleakala || AMOS ||  || align=right | 2.2 km || 
|-id=266 bgcolor=#E9E9E9
| 545266 ||  || — || April 18, 2007 || Catalina || CSS ||  || align=right | 1.8 km || 
|-id=267 bgcolor=#E9E9E9
| 545267 ||  || — || March 4, 2011 || Mount Lemmon || Mount Lemmon Survey ||  || align=right | 2.2 km || 
|-id=268 bgcolor=#E9E9E9
| 545268 ||  || — || March 5, 2011 || Mount Lemmon || Mount Lemmon Survey ||  || align=right | 1.1 km || 
|-id=269 bgcolor=#E9E9E9
| 545269 ||  || — || March 10, 2011 || Kitt Peak || Spacewatch ||  || align=right | 1.4 km || 
|-id=270 bgcolor=#E9E9E9
| 545270 ||  || — || January 22, 2015 || Haleakala || Pan-STARRS ||  || align=right data-sort-value="0.98" | 980 m || 
|-id=271 bgcolor=#E9E9E9
| 545271 ||  || — || November 27, 2013 || Haleakala || Pan-STARRS ||  || align=right | 1.5 km || 
|-id=272 bgcolor=#E9E9E9
| 545272 ||  || — || March 2, 2011 || Kitt Peak || Spacewatch ||  || align=right | 1.8 km || 
|-id=273 bgcolor=#E9E9E9
| 545273 ||  || — || March 13, 2011 || Kitt Peak || Spacewatch ||  || align=right | 1.9 km || 
|-id=274 bgcolor=#FFC2E0
| 545274 ||  || — || March 25, 2011 || Mount Lemmon || Mount Lemmon Survey || APO +1km || align=right | 1.1 km || 
|-id=275 bgcolor=#E9E9E9
| 545275 ||  || — || March 24, 2011 || Kitt Peak || Spacewatch ||  || align=right | 2.2 km || 
|-id=276 bgcolor=#E9E9E9
| 545276 ||  || — || March 31, 2007 || Palomar || NEAT ||  || align=right | 1.1 km || 
|-id=277 bgcolor=#E9E9E9
| 545277 ||  || — || January 19, 2002 || Kitt Peak || Spacewatch ||  || align=right | 1.2 km || 
|-id=278 bgcolor=#E9E9E9
| 545278 ||  || — || March 13, 2011 || Kitt Peak || Spacewatch ||  || align=right | 1.2 km || 
|-id=279 bgcolor=#E9E9E9
| 545279 ||  || — || December 19, 2009 || Mount Lemmon || Mount Lemmon Survey ||  || align=right | 2.1 km || 
|-id=280 bgcolor=#E9E9E9
| 545280 ||  || — || March 28, 2011 || Mount Lemmon || Mount Lemmon Survey ||  || align=right | 1.3 km || 
|-id=281 bgcolor=#E9E9E9
| 545281 ||  || — || March 1, 2011 || Mount Lemmon || Mount Lemmon Survey ||  || align=right | 1.3 km || 
|-id=282 bgcolor=#E9E9E9
| 545282 ||  || — || November 9, 2009 || Mount Lemmon || Mount Lemmon Survey ||  || align=right | 1.5 km || 
|-id=283 bgcolor=#E9E9E9
| 545283 ||  || — || March 30, 2011 || Piszkesteto || Z. Kuli, K. Sárneczky ||  || align=right | 2.1 km || 
|-id=284 bgcolor=#E9E9E9
| 545284 ||  || — || March 27, 2011 || Mount Lemmon || Mount Lemmon Survey ||  || align=right | 1.3 km || 
|-id=285 bgcolor=#E9E9E9
| 545285 ||  || — || October 17, 2008 || Kitt Peak || Spacewatch ||  || align=right | 1.8 km || 
|-id=286 bgcolor=#E9E9E9
| 545286 ||  || — || March 28, 2011 || Catalina || CSS ||  || align=right | 1.3 km || 
|-id=287 bgcolor=#E9E9E9
| 545287 ||  || — || April 13, 2002 || Kitt Peak || Spacewatch ||  || align=right | 1.4 km || 
|-id=288 bgcolor=#E9E9E9
| 545288 ||  || — || March 29, 2011 || Kitt Peak || Spacewatch ||  || align=right | 2.1 km || 
|-id=289 bgcolor=#E9E9E9
| 545289 ||  || — || March 30, 2011 || Mount Lemmon || Mount Lemmon Survey ||  || align=right | 1.5 km || 
|-id=290 bgcolor=#E9E9E9
| 545290 ||  || — || September 6, 2008 || Kitt Peak || Spacewatch ||  || align=right | 1.4 km || 
|-id=291 bgcolor=#E9E9E9
| 545291 ||  || — || March 30, 2011 || Mount Lemmon || Mount Lemmon Survey ||  || align=right | 1.8 km || 
|-id=292 bgcolor=#E9E9E9
| 545292 ||  || — || March 30, 2011 || Mount Lemmon || Mount Lemmon Survey || AEO || align=right data-sort-value="0.91" | 910 m || 
|-id=293 bgcolor=#C2E0FF
| 545293 ||  || — || March 28, 2011 || La Silla || La Silla Obs. || centaurcritical || align=right | 162 km || 
|-id=294 bgcolor=#E9E9E9
| 545294 ||  || — || February 23, 2011 || Kitt Peak || Spacewatch || JUN || align=right data-sort-value="0.71" | 710 m || 
|-id=295 bgcolor=#E9E9E9
| 545295 ||  || — || December 25, 2005 || Mount Lemmon || Mount Lemmon Survey ||  || align=right | 1.5 km || 
|-id=296 bgcolor=#E9E9E9
| 545296 ||  || — || March 2, 2011 || Mount Lemmon || Mount Lemmon Survey ||  || align=right | 1.9 km || 
|-id=297 bgcolor=#E9E9E9
| 545297 ||  || — || September 26, 2009 || Kitt Peak || Spacewatch ||  || align=right | 1.7 km || 
|-id=298 bgcolor=#E9E9E9
| 545298 ||  || — || March 29, 2011 || Catalina || CSS ||  || align=right | 2.5 km || 
|-id=299 bgcolor=#E9E9E9
| 545299 ||  || — || March 1, 2011 || Mount Lemmon || Mount Lemmon Survey ||  || align=right | 1.4 km || 
|-id=300 bgcolor=#E9E9E9
| 545300 ||  || — || March 27, 2011 || Mount Lemmon || Mount Lemmon Survey ||  || align=right | 1.2 km || 
|}

545301–545400 

|-bgcolor=#E9E9E9
| 545301 ||  || — || March 28, 2011 || Mount Lemmon || Mount Lemmon Survey ||  || align=right | 1.9 km || 
|-id=302 bgcolor=#E9E9E9
| 545302 ||  || — || March 10, 2011 || Kitt Peak || Spacewatch ||  || align=right | 1.1 km || 
|-id=303 bgcolor=#E9E9E9
| 545303 ||  || — || March 30, 2011 || Mount Lemmon || Mount Lemmon Survey ||  || align=right | 2.4 km || 
|-id=304 bgcolor=#E9E9E9
| 545304 ||  || — || February 25, 2011 || Kitt Peak || Spacewatch ||  || align=right | 1.1 km || 
|-id=305 bgcolor=#E9E9E9
| 545305 ||  || — || March 28, 2011 || Mount Lemmon || Mount Lemmon Survey ||  || align=right data-sort-value="0.81" | 810 m || 
|-id=306 bgcolor=#E9E9E9
| 545306 ||  || — || March 29, 2011 || Mount Lemmon || Mount Lemmon Survey ||  || align=right | 1.2 km || 
|-id=307 bgcolor=#E9E9E9
| 545307 ||  || — || February 25, 2011 || Mount Lemmon || Mount Lemmon Survey ||  || align=right | 1.3 km || 
|-id=308 bgcolor=#E9E9E9
| 545308 ||  || — || July 17, 2004 || Cerro Tololo || Cerro Tololo Obs. ||  || align=right | 1.5 km || 
|-id=309 bgcolor=#E9E9E9
| 545309 ||  || — || October 4, 2013 || Mount Lemmon || Mount Lemmon Survey ||  || align=right | 1.0 km || 
|-id=310 bgcolor=#E9E9E9
| 545310 ||  || — || April 1, 2011 || Mount Lemmon || Mount Lemmon Survey || HNS || align=right | 1.00 km || 
|-id=311 bgcolor=#E9E9E9
| 545311 ||  || — || October 9, 2013 || Mount Lemmon || Mount Lemmon Survey ||  || align=right | 1.3 km || 
|-id=312 bgcolor=#E9E9E9
| 545312 ||  || — || September 3, 2008 || Kitt Peak || Spacewatch ||  || align=right | 1.3 km || 
|-id=313 bgcolor=#E9E9E9
| 545313 ||  || — || September 25, 2008 || Mount Lemmon || Mount Lemmon Survey ||  || align=right | 1.7 km || 
|-id=314 bgcolor=#E9E9E9
| 545314 ||  || — || May 10, 2007 || Kitt Peak || Spacewatch ||  || align=right | 1.1 km || 
|-id=315 bgcolor=#E9E9E9
| 545315 ||  || — || February 24, 2006 || Anderson Mesa || LONEOS ||  || align=right | 2.2 km || 
|-id=316 bgcolor=#E9E9E9
| 545316 ||  || — || December 26, 2005 || Mount Lemmon || Mount Lemmon Survey ||  || align=right | 1.1 km || 
|-id=317 bgcolor=#E9E9E9
| 545317 ||  || — || November 17, 2009 || Mount Lemmon || Mount Lemmon Survey ||  || align=right | 1.4 km || 
|-id=318 bgcolor=#E9E9E9
| 545318 ||  || — || February 8, 2011 || Mount Lemmon || Mount Lemmon Survey ||  || align=right | 1.2 km || 
|-id=319 bgcolor=#E9E9E9
| 545319 ||  || — || March 28, 2011 || Kitt Peak || Spacewatch ||  || align=right | 1.4 km || 
|-id=320 bgcolor=#E9E9E9
| 545320 ||  || — || March 6, 2011 || Kitt Peak || Spacewatch ||  || align=right | 1.5 km || 
|-id=321 bgcolor=#E9E9E9
| 545321 ||  || — || November 28, 2013 || Haleakala || Pan-STARRS ||  || align=right | 2.0 km || 
|-id=322 bgcolor=#E9E9E9
| 545322 ||  || — || November 27, 2009 || Mount Lemmon || Mount Lemmon Survey ||  || align=right | 2.6 km || 
|-id=323 bgcolor=#E9E9E9
| 545323 ||  || — || February 25, 2007 || Mount Lemmon || Mount Lemmon Survey ||  || align=right | 2.8 km || 
|-id=324 bgcolor=#E9E9E9
| 545324 ||  || — || December 24, 2013 || Mount Lemmon || Mount Lemmon Survey ||  || align=right | 1.9 km || 
|-id=325 bgcolor=#E9E9E9
| 545325 ||  || — || October 18, 2009 || Mount Lemmon || Mount Lemmon Survey ||  || align=right | 1.5 km || 
|-id=326 bgcolor=#E9E9E9
| 545326 ||  || — || March 27, 2011 || Mount Lemmon || Mount Lemmon Survey ||  || align=right | 1.3 km || 
|-id=327 bgcolor=#E9E9E9
| 545327 ||  || — || March 30, 2011 || Mount Lemmon || Mount Lemmon Survey ||  || align=right | 1.1 km || 
|-id=328 bgcolor=#E9E9E9
| 545328 ||  || — || March 26, 2011 || Mount Lemmon || Mount Lemmon Survey ||  || align=right | 1.6 km || 
|-id=329 bgcolor=#E9E9E9
| 545329 ||  || — || November 27, 2013 || Haleakala || Pan-STARRS ||  || align=right | 1.2 km || 
|-id=330 bgcolor=#E9E9E9
| 545330 ||  || — || October 5, 2013 || Haleakala || Pan-STARRS ||  || align=right | 1.2 km || 
|-id=331 bgcolor=#E9E9E9
| 545331 ||  || — || March 26, 2011 || Mount Lemmon || Mount Lemmon Survey ||  || align=right | 1.3 km || 
|-id=332 bgcolor=#E9E9E9
| 545332 ||  || — || March 26, 2011 || Mount Lemmon || Mount Lemmon Survey ||  || align=right | 1.6 km || 
|-id=333 bgcolor=#E9E9E9
| 545333 ||  || — || March 27, 2011 || Mount Lemmon || Mount Lemmon Survey ||  || align=right | 2.0 km || 
|-id=334 bgcolor=#E9E9E9
| 545334 ||  || — || September 24, 2013 || Mount Lemmon || Mount Lemmon Survey ||  || align=right | 1.1 km || 
|-id=335 bgcolor=#E9E9E9
| 545335 ||  || — || October 28, 2013 || Mount Lemmon || Mount Lemmon Survey ||  || align=right | 1.3 km || 
|-id=336 bgcolor=#E9E9E9
| 545336 ||  || — || April 9, 2002 || Kitt Peak || Spacewatch ||  || align=right | 1.9 km || 
|-id=337 bgcolor=#E9E9E9
| 545337 ||  || — || April 2, 2011 || Mount Lemmon || Mount Lemmon Survey ||  || align=right | 1.1 km || 
|-id=338 bgcolor=#E9E9E9
| 545338 ||  || — || April 2, 2011 || Mount Lemmon || Mount Lemmon Survey ||  || align=right | 1.4 km || 
|-id=339 bgcolor=#E9E9E9
| 545339 ||  || — || February 4, 2006 || Kitt Peak || Spacewatch ||  || align=right | 1.3 km || 
|-id=340 bgcolor=#E9E9E9
| 545340 ||  || — || August 3, 2008 || Siding Spring || SSS ||  || align=right | 1.8 km || 
|-id=341 bgcolor=#E9E9E9
| 545341 ||  || — || April 2, 2011 || Mount Lemmon || Mount Lemmon Survey ||  || align=right | 1.6 km || 
|-id=342 bgcolor=#E9E9E9
| 545342 ||  || — || March 14, 2007 || Kitt Peak || Spacewatch ||  || align=right | 1.3 km || 
|-id=343 bgcolor=#E9E9E9
| 545343 ||  || — || November 25, 2009 || Kitt Peak || Spacewatch ||  || align=right | 1.4 km || 
|-id=344 bgcolor=#E9E9E9
| 545344 ||  || — || October 30, 2008 || Mount Lemmon || Mount Lemmon Survey ||  || align=right | 1.6 km || 
|-id=345 bgcolor=#E9E9E9
| 545345 ||  || — || April 19, 2007 || Mount Lemmon || Mount Lemmon Survey ||  || align=right | 2.6 km || 
|-id=346 bgcolor=#E9E9E9
| 545346 ||  || — || September 21, 2009 || Mount Lemmon || Mount Lemmon Survey ||  || align=right | 1.3 km || 
|-id=347 bgcolor=#E9E9E9
| 545347 ||  || — || April 4, 2011 || Mount Lemmon || Mount Lemmon Survey ||  || align=right | 1.9 km || 
|-id=348 bgcolor=#E9E9E9
| 545348 ||  || — || April 4, 2011 || Mount Lemmon || Mount Lemmon Survey ||  || align=right | 1.3 km || 
|-id=349 bgcolor=#E9E9E9
| 545349 ||  || — || April 2, 2011 || Bergisch Gladbach || W. Bickel ||  || align=right | 1.2 km || 
|-id=350 bgcolor=#E9E9E9
| 545350 ||  || — || June 16, 2012 || Haleakala || Pan-STARRS ||  || align=right | 1.3 km || 
|-id=351 bgcolor=#E9E9E9
| 545351 ||  || — || March 5, 2002 || Kitt Peak || Spacewatch || JUN || align=right data-sort-value="0.65" | 650 m || 
|-id=352 bgcolor=#E9E9E9
| 545352 ||  || — || December 16, 2009 || Mount Lemmon || Mount Lemmon Survey ||  || align=right | 1.7 km || 
|-id=353 bgcolor=#E9E9E9
| 545353 ||  || — || April 28, 2007 || Kitt Peak || Spacewatch ||  || align=right | 1.5 km || 
|-id=354 bgcolor=#E9E9E9
| 545354 ||  || — || April 5, 2011 || Catalina || CSS ||  || align=right | 1.7 km || 
|-id=355 bgcolor=#E9E9E9
| 545355 ||  || — || October 9, 2013 || Mount Lemmon || Mount Lemmon Survey ||  || align=right | 1.3 km || 
|-id=356 bgcolor=#E9E9E9
| 545356 ||  || — || March 29, 2011 || Kitt Peak || Spacewatch ||  || align=right | 1.7 km || 
|-id=357 bgcolor=#E9E9E9
| 545357 ||  || — || December 2, 2005 || Kitt Peak || L. H. Wasserman, R. Millis ||  || align=right | 2.2 km || 
|-id=358 bgcolor=#E9E9E9
| 545358 ||  || — || March 4, 2011 || Mount Lemmon || Mount Lemmon Survey ||  || align=right | 1.7 km || 
|-id=359 bgcolor=#E9E9E9
| 545359 ||  || — || November 1, 2008 || Mount Lemmon || Mount Lemmon Survey ||  || align=right | 2.4 km || 
|-id=360 bgcolor=#E9E9E9
| 545360 ||  || — || April 9, 2011 || Dauban || C. Rinner, F. Kugel ||  || align=right | 2.4 km || 
|-id=361 bgcolor=#C2E0FF
| 545361 ||  || — || April 9, 2011 || La Silla || La Silla Obs. || cubewano (hot) || align=right | 295 km || 
|-id=362 bgcolor=#E9E9E9
| 545362 ||  || — || March 12, 2002 || Palomar || NEAT ||  || align=right | 1.8 km || 
|-id=363 bgcolor=#E9E9E9
| 545363 ||  || — || April 5, 2011 || Catalina || CSS ||  || align=right | 1.6 km || 
|-id=364 bgcolor=#E9E9E9
| 545364 ||  || — || April 4, 2011 || Catalina || CSS ||  || align=right | 2.1 km || 
|-id=365 bgcolor=#E9E9E9
| 545365 ||  || — || April 1, 2011 || Kitt Peak || Spacewatch ||  || align=right | 1.3 km || 
|-id=366 bgcolor=#E9E9E9
| 545366 ||  || — || January 4, 2006 || Kitt Peak || Spacewatch ||  || align=right | 1.6 km || 
|-id=367 bgcolor=#E9E9E9
| 545367 ||  || — || April 5, 2011 || Mayhill-ISON || L. Elenin ||  || align=right | 1.2 km || 
|-id=368 bgcolor=#E9E9E9
| 545368 ||  || — || October 6, 2008 || Mount Lemmon || Mount Lemmon Survey ||  || align=right | 2.8 km || 
|-id=369 bgcolor=#E9E9E9
| 545369 ||  || — || December 28, 2005 || Kitt Peak || Spacewatch ||  || align=right | 1.2 km || 
|-id=370 bgcolor=#E9E9E9
| 545370 ||  || — || April 13, 2011 || Kitt Peak || Spacewatch ||  || align=right | 2.3 km || 
|-id=371 bgcolor=#E9E9E9
| 545371 ||  || — || March 10, 2011 || Mount Lemmon || Mount Lemmon Survey ||  || align=right | 2.9 km || 
|-id=372 bgcolor=#E9E9E9
| 545372 ||  || — || April 13, 2011 || Haleakala || Pan-STARRS ||  || align=right | 2.3 km || 
|-id=373 bgcolor=#E9E9E9
| 545373 ||  || — || March 27, 2011 || Mount Lemmon || Mount Lemmon Survey ||  || align=right | 1.3 km || 
|-id=374 bgcolor=#E9E9E9
| 545374 ||  || — || April 3, 2011 || Haleakala || Pan-STARRS ||  || align=right | 1.7 km || 
|-id=375 bgcolor=#E9E9E9
| 545375 ||  || — || December 7, 2013 || Haleakala || Pan-STARRS ||  || align=right | 2.3 km || 
|-id=376 bgcolor=#E9E9E9
| 545376 ||  || — || April 12, 2011 || Mount Lemmon || Mount Lemmon Survey ||  || align=right | 1.0 km || 
|-id=377 bgcolor=#E9E9E9
| 545377 ||  || — || November 25, 2013 || Haleakala || Pan-STARRS ||  || align=right | 1.7 km || 
|-id=378 bgcolor=#E9E9E9
| 545378 ||  || — || January 14, 2015 || Haleakala || Pan-STARRS ||  || align=right | 1.6 km || 
|-id=379 bgcolor=#E9E9E9
| 545379 ||  || — || October 13, 2013 || Kitt Peak || Spacewatch ||  || align=right | 1.1 km || 
|-id=380 bgcolor=#E9E9E9
| 545380 ||  || — || April 23, 2011 || Haleakala || Pan-STARRS ||  || align=right | 1.7 km || 
|-id=381 bgcolor=#E9E9E9
| 545381 ||  || — || August 20, 2003 || Haleakala || AMOS ||  || align=right | 1.4 km || 
|-id=382 bgcolor=#E9E9E9
| 545382 ||  || — || April 26, 2011 || Kitt Peak || Spacewatch ||  || align=right | 2.5 km || 
|-id=383 bgcolor=#E9E9E9
| 545383 ||  || — || April 22, 2002 || Palomar || NEAT ||  || align=right | 2.2 km || 
|-id=384 bgcolor=#E9E9E9
| 545384 ||  || — || April 27, 2011 || Haleakala || Pan-STARRS ||  || align=right | 1.9 km || 
|-id=385 bgcolor=#E9E9E9
| 545385 ||  || — || April 5, 2011 || Kitt Peak || Spacewatch ||  || align=right | 1.4 km || 
|-id=386 bgcolor=#E9E9E9
| 545386 ||  || — || October 6, 2008 || Mount Lemmon || Mount Lemmon Survey ||  || align=right | 2.0 km || 
|-id=387 bgcolor=#FA8072
| 545387 ||  || — || April 22, 2011 || Kitt Peak || Spacewatch ||  || align=right data-sort-value="0.58" | 580 m || 
|-id=388 bgcolor=#E9E9E9
| 545388 ||  || — || March 25, 2011 || Kitt Peak || Spacewatch ||  || align=right | 1.4 km || 
|-id=389 bgcolor=#d6d6d6
| 545389 ||  || — || August 29, 2005 || Kitt Peak || Spacewatch || 3:2 || align=right | 4.3 km || 
|-id=390 bgcolor=#E9E9E9
| 545390 ||  || — || April 13, 2011 || Kitt Peak || Spacewatch ||  || align=right | 2.1 km || 
|-id=391 bgcolor=#E9E9E9
| 545391 ||  || — || April 27, 2011 || Kitt Peak || Spacewatch ||  || align=right | 2.2 km || 
|-id=392 bgcolor=#E9E9E9
| 545392 ||  || — || March 15, 2011 || Mount Lemmon || Mount Lemmon Survey || EUN || align=right | 1.6 km || 
|-id=393 bgcolor=#E9E9E9
| 545393 ||  || — || April 27, 2011 || Kitt Peak || Spacewatch ||  || align=right | 2.1 km || 
|-id=394 bgcolor=#E9E9E9
| 545394 Rossetter ||  ||  || November 2, 2008 || Vail-Jarnac || T. Glinos, D. H. Levy ||  || align=right | 2.0 km || 
|-id=395 bgcolor=#E9E9E9
| 545395 ||  || — || April 28, 2011 || Kitt Peak || Spacewatch ||  || align=right | 2.2 km || 
|-id=396 bgcolor=#E9E9E9
| 545396 ||  || — || April 13, 2011 || Mount Lemmon || Mount Lemmon Survey ||  || align=right | 1.2 km || 
|-id=397 bgcolor=#E9E9E9
| 545397 ||  || — || December 15, 2009 || Mount Lemmon || Mount Lemmon Survey ||  || align=right | 2.4 km || 
|-id=398 bgcolor=#E9E9E9
| 545398 ||  || — || December 19, 2009 || Mount Lemmon || Mount Lemmon Survey ||  || align=right | 2.1 km || 
|-id=399 bgcolor=#E9E9E9
| 545399 ||  || — || March 20, 2002 || Palomar || NEAT ||  || align=right | 1.3 km || 
|-id=400 bgcolor=#E9E9E9
| 545400 ||  || — || April 28, 2011 || Kitt Peak || Spacewatch ||  || align=right | 2.2 km || 
|}

545401–545500 

|-bgcolor=#E9E9E9
| 545401 ||  || — || April 30, 2011 || Calvin-Rehoboth || L. A. Molnar ||  || align=right | 3.2 km || 
|-id=402 bgcolor=#E9E9E9
| 545402 ||  || — || October 31, 2005 || Mauna Kea || Mauna Kea Obs. ||  || align=right | 2.9 km || 
|-id=403 bgcolor=#E9E9E9
| 545403 ||  || — || April 21, 2011 || Haleakala || Pan-STARRS ||  || align=right | 2.2 km || 
|-id=404 bgcolor=#E9E9E9
| 545404 ||  || — || November 25, 2009 || Mount Lemmon || Mount Lemmon Survey ||  || align=right | 2.2 km || 
|-id=405 bgcolor=#E9E9E9
| 545405 ||  || — || October 15, 2004 || Mount Lemmon || Mount Lemmon Survey ||  || align=right | 1.5 km || 
|-id=406 bgcolor=#d6d6d6
| 545406 ||  || — || October 23, 2006 || Kitt Peak || Spacewatch || 3:2 || align=right | 4.5 km || 
|-id=407 bgcolor=#E9E9E9
| 545407 ||  || — || October 8, 2008 || Kitt Peak || Spacewatch ||  || align=right | 1.9 km || 
|-id=408 bgcolor=#E9E9E9
| 545408 ||  || — || March 28, 2011 || Kitt Peak || Spacewatch ||  || align=right | 2.1 km || 
|-id=409 bgcolor=#E9E9E9
| 545409 ||  || — || January 25, 2006 || Kitt Peak || Spacewatch ||  || align=right | 1.1 km || 
|-id=410 bgcolor=#E9E9E9
| 545410 ||  || — || April 7, 2011 || Kitt Peak || Spacewatch ||  || align=right | 1.8 km || 
|-id=411 bgcolor=#E9E9E9
| 545411 ||  || — || October 23, 2004 || Kitt Peak || Spacewatch ||  || align=right | 2.1 km || 
|-id=412 bgcolor=#E9E9E9
| 545412 ||  || — || April 12, 2002 || Palomar || NEAT ||  || align=right | 1.7 km || 
|-id=413 bgcolor=#E9E9E9
| 545413 ||  || — || October 26, 2003 || Anderson Mesa || LONEOS ||  || align=right | 3.7 km || 
|-id=414 bgcolor=#E9E9E9
| 545414 ||  || — || May 10, 2007 || Mount Lemmon || Mount Lemmon Survey ||  || align=right | 1.1 km || 
|-id=415 bgcolor=#d6d6d6
| 545415 ||  || — || March 27, 2011 || Mount Lemmon || Mount Lemmon Survey || 3:2 || align=right | 4.5 km || 
|-id=416 bgcolor=#E9E9E9
| 545416 ||  || — || February 6, 2006 || Mount Lemmon || Mount Lemmon Survey ||  || align=right | 1.9 km || 
|-id=417 bgcolor=#E9E9E9
| 545417 ||  || — || April 28, 2011 || Kitt Peak || Spacewatch ||  || align=right | 2.3 km || 
|-id=418 bgcolor=#E9E9E9
| 545418 ||  || — || February 1, 2006 || Mount Lemmon || Mount Lemmon Survey ||  || align=right | 1.5 km || 
|-id=419 bgcolor=#E9E9E9
| 545419 ||  || — || April 4, 2011 || Kitt Peak || Spacewatch ||  || align=right | 1.9 km || 
|-id=420 bgcolor=#E9E9E9
| 545420 ||  || — || August 12, 2007 || XuYi || PMO NEO ||  || align=right | 1.9 km || 
|-id=421 bgcolor=#E9E9E9
| 545421 ||  || — || April 28, 2011 || Haleakala || Pan-STARRS ||  || align=right | 2.9 km || 
|-id=422 bgcolor=#E9E9E9
| 545422 ||  || — || April 30, 2011 || Mount Lemmon || Mount Lemmon Survey ||  || align=right | 1.2 km || 
|-id=423 bgcolor=#E9E9E9
| 545423 ||  || — || March 28, 2011 || Kitt Peak || Spacewatch ||  || align=right | 1.3 km || 
|-id=424 bgcolor=#E9E9E9
| 545424 ||  || — || April 30, 2011 || Haleakala || Pan-STARRS ||  || align=right | 2.2 km || 
|-id=425 bgcolor=#E9E9E9
| 545425 ||  || — || April 27, 2011 || Mount Lemmon || Mount Lemmon Survey ||  || align=right | 1.8 km || 
|-id=426 bgcolor=#E9E9E9
| 545426 ||  || — || November 27, 2013 || Haleakala || Pan-STARRS ||  || align=right | 1.5 km || 
|-id=427 bgcolor=#E9E9E9
| 545427 ||  || — || March 18, 2015 || Haleakala || Pan-STARRS ||  || align=right | 1.2 km || 
|-id=428 bgcolor=#E9E9E9
| 545428 ||  || — || March 13, 2015 || Mount Lemmon || Mount Lemmon Survey ||  || align=right | 1.2 km || 
|-id=429 bgcolor=#E9E9E9
| 545429 ||  || — || February 18, 2015 || Haleakala || Pan-STARRS ||  || align=right | 1.1 km || 
|-id=430 bgcolor=#E9E9E9
| 545430 ||  || — || May 2, 2011 || Catalina || CSS ||  || align=right | 1.4 km || 
|-id=431 bgcolor=#E9E9E9
| 545431 ||  || — || April 30, 2011 || Mount Lemmon || Mount Lemmon Survey ||  || align=right | 1.3 km || 
|-id=432 bgcolor=#E9E9E9
| 545432 ||  || — || November 10, 2004 || Kitt Peak || Spacewatch ||  || align=right | 1.9 km || 
|-id=433 bgcolor=#E9E9E9
| 545433 ||  || — || May 6, 2011 || Mount Lemmon || Mount Lemmon Survey ||  || align=right | 2.2 km || 
|-id=434 bgcolor=#E9E9E9
| 545434 ||  || — || April 28, 2011 || Kitt Peak || Spacewatch ||  || align=right | 1.9 km || 
|-id=435 bgcolor=#E9E9E9
| 545435 ||  || — || May 13, 2002 || Palomar || NEAT ||  || align=right | 2.7 km || 
|-id=436 bgcolor=#E9E9E9
| 545436 ||  || — || May 17, 2002 || Kitt Peak || Spacewatch ||  || align=right | 1.5 km || 
|-id=437 bgcolor=#E9E9E9
| 545437 ||  || — || April 24, 2011 || Catalina || CSS ||  || align=right | 2.7 km || 
|-id=438 bgcolor=#E9E9E9
| 545438 ||  || — || January 12, 2010 || Mount Lemmon || Mount Lemmon Survey ||  || align=right | 2.3 km || 
|-id=439 bgcolor=#E9E9E9
| 545439 ||  || — || August 25, 2003 || Cerro Tololo || Cerro Tololo Obs. ||  || align=right | 2.6 km || 
|-id=440 bgcolor=#E9E9E9
| 545440 ||  || — || May 1, 2011 || Mount Lemmon || Mount Lemmon Survey ||  || align=right | 1.4 km || 
|-id=441 bgcolor=#E9E9E9
| 545441 ||  || — || October 2, 2008 || Mount Lemmon || Mount Lemmon Survey ||  || align=right | 1.7 km || 
|-id=442 bgcolor=#E9E9E9
| 545442 ||  || — || November 3, 2008 || Mount Lemmon || Mount Lemmon Survey ||  || align=right | 2.4 km || 
|-id=443 bgcolor=#E9E9E9
| 545443 ||  || — || March 14, 2011 || Mount Lemmon || Mount Lemmon Survey ||  || align=right | 2.0 km || 
|-id=444 bgcolor=#fefefe
| 545444 ||  || — || May 4, 2011 || Modra || Š. Gajdoš, J. Világi || H || align=right data-sort-value="0.81" | 810 m || 
|-id=445 bgcolor=#E9E9E9
| 545445 ||  || — || May 1, 2011 || Mount Lemmon || Mount Lemmon Survey ||  || align=right | 1.7 km || 
|-id=446 bgcolor=#E9E9E9
| 545446 ||  || — || April 16, 2015 || Mount Lemmon || Mount Lemmon Survey ||  || align=right | 1.1 km || 
|-id=447 bgcolor=#E9E9E9
| 545447 ||  || — || May 1, 2011 || Haleakala || Pan-STARRS ||  || align=right | 2.5 km || 
|-id=448 bgcolor=#E9E9E9
| 545448 ||  || — || May 12, 2011 || Kitt Peak || Spacewatch ||  || align=right | 1.9 km || 
|-id=449 bgcolor=#E9E9E9
| 545449 ||  || — || April 27, 2011 || Mount Lemmon || Mount Lemmon Survey ||  || align=right | 2.8 km || 
|-id=450 bgcolor=#E9E9E9
| 545450 ||  || — || May 3, 2011 || Mount Lemmon || Mount Lemmon Survey ||  || align=right | 2.1 km || 
|-id=451 bgcolor=#E9E9E9
| 545451 ||  || — || April 21, 2002 || Palomar || NEAT || JUN || align=right | 1.4 km || 
|-id=452 bgcolor=#E9E9E9
| 545452 ||  || — || August 10, 2007 || Kitt Peak || Spacewatch ||  || align=right | 1.9 km || 
|-id=453 bgcolor=#E9E9E9
| 545453 ||  || — || September 22, 2008 || Kitt Peak || Spacewatch ||  || align=right data-sort-value="0.98" | 980 m || 
|-id=454 bgcolor=#E9E9E9
| 545454 ||  || — || May 24, 2011 || Nogales || M. Schwartz, P. R. Holvorcem ||  || align=right | 3.0 km || 
|-id=455 bgcolor=#E9E9E9
| 545455 ||  || — || May 27, 2011 || Nogales || M. Schwartz, P. R. Holvorcem ||  || align=right | 2.4 km || 
|-id=456 bgcolor=#E9E9E9
| 545456 ||  || — || June 5, 2002 || Kitt Peak || Spacewatch || EUN || align=right data-sort-value="0.93" | 930 m || 
|-id=457 bgcolor=#C2FFFF
| 545457 ||  || — || April 15, 2008 || Mount Lemmon || Mount Lemmon Survey || L5 || align=right | 7.9 km || 
|-id=458 bgcolor=#E9E9E9
| 545458 ||  || — || May 5, 2011 || Mount Lemmon || Mount Lemmon Survey ||  || align=right | 2.6 km || 
|-id=459 bgcolor=#E9E9E9
| 545459 ||  || — || May 23, 2011 || Bergisch Gladbach || W. Bickel ||  || align=right | 1.8 km || 
|-id=460 bgcolor=#E9E9E9
| 545460 ||  || — || July 25, 2003 || Palomar || NEAT ||  || align=right | 1.0 km || 
|-id=461 bgcolor=#E9E9E9
| 545461 ||  || — || October 1, 2003 || Kitt Peak || Spacewatch ||  || align=right | 2.6 km || 
|-id=462 bgcolor=#E9E9E9
| 545462 ||  || — || May 23, 2011 || Mount Lemmon || Mount Lemmon Survey ||  || align=right | 1.9 km || 
|-id=463 bgcolor=#E9E9E9
| 545463 ||  || — || March 23, 2006 || Mount Lemmon || Mount Lemmon Survey ||  || align=right | 1.9 km || 
|-id=464 bgcolor=#E9E9E9
| 545464 ||  || — || May 24, 2011 || Haleakala || Pan-STARRS ||  || align=right | 2.3 km || 
|-id=465 bgcolor=#E9E9E9
| 545465 ||  || — || May 2, 2006 || Mount Lemmon || Mount Lemmon Survey ||  || align=right | 2.0 km || 
|-id=466 bgcolor=#E9E9E9
| 545466 ||  || — || September 14, 2007 || Kitt Peak || Spacewatch ||  || align=right | 1.7 km || 
|-id=467 bgcolor=#E9E9E9
| 545467 ||  || — || May 31, 2011 || Mount Lemmon || Mount Lemmon Survey ||  || align=right | 2.1 km || 
|-id=468 bgcolor=#E9E9E9
| 545468 ||  || — || January 28, 2015 || Haleakala || Pan-STARRS ||  || align=right | 1.7 km || 
|-id=469 bgcolor=#E9E9E9
| 545469 ||  || — || September 17, 2012 || Mount Lemmon || Mount Lemmon Survey ||  || align=right | 1.8 km || 
|-id=470 bgcolor=#E9E9E9
| 545470 ||  || — || August 31, 2017 || Haleakala || Pan-STARRS ||  || align=right | 1.6 km || 
|-id=471 bgcolor=#E9E9E9
| 545471 ||  || — || December 29, 2014 || Haleakala || Pan-STARRS ||  || align=right | 1.5 km || 
|-id=472 bgcolor=#E9E9E9
| 545472 ||  || — || October 28, 2013 || Kitt Peak || Spacewatch ||  || align=right | 1.4 km || 
|-id=473 bgcolor=#E9E9E9
| 545473 ||  || — || May 21, 2011 || Mount Lemmon || Mount Lemmon Survey ||  || align=right | 1.7 km || 
|-id=474 bgcolor=#E9E9E9
| 545474 ||  || — || June 4, 2011 || Mount Lemmon || Mount Lemmon Survey ||  || align=right | 2.0 km || 
|-id=475 bgcolor=#E9E9E9
| 545475 ||  || — || June 5, 2011 || Mount Lemmon || Mount Lemmon Survey ||  || align=right | 1.8 km || 
|-id=476 bgcolor=#E9E9E9
| 545476 ||  || — || June 3, 2011 || Nogales || M. Schwartz, P. R. Holvorcem ||  || align=right | 2.1 km || 
|-id=477 bgcolor=#E9E9E9
| 545477 ||  || — || May 23, 2011 || Mount Lemmon || Mount Lemmon Survey ||  || align=right | 1.7 km || 
|-id=478 bgcolor=#E9E9E9
| 545478 ||  || — || April 26, 2011 || Mount Lemmon || Mount Lemmon Survey ||  || align=right | 1.7 km || 
|-id=479 bgcolor=#C2FFFF
| 545479 ||  || — || June 13, 2011 || Mount Lemmon || Mount Lemmon Survey || L5 || align=right | 9.6 km || 
|-id=480 bgcolor=#E9E9E9
| 545480 ||  || — || June 6, 2011 || Haleakala || Pan-STARRS ||  || align=right | 1.2 km || 
|-id=481 bgcolor=#E9E9E9
| 545481 ||  || — || June 2, 2011 || Haleakala || Pan-STARRS ||  || align=right | 2.4 km || 
|-id=482 bgcolor=#E9E9E9
| 545482 ||  || — || October 23, 2008 || Kitt Peak || Spacewatch ||  || align=right | 2.0 km || 
|-id=483 bgcolor=#E9E9E9
| 545483 ||  || — || June 7, 2011 || Haleakala || Pan-STARRS ||  || align=right | 2.4 km || 
|-id=484 bgcolor=#E9E9E9
| 545484 ||  || — || May 13, 2011 || Mount Lemmon || Mount Lemmon Survey ||  || align=right | 1.5 km || 
|-id=485 bgcolor=#fefefe
| 545485 ||  || — || June 8, 2011 || Mount Lemmon || Mount Lemmon Survey ||  || align=right data-sort-value="0.56" | 560 m || 
|-id=486 bgcolor=#E9E9E9
| 545486 ||  || — || January 28, 2015 || Haleakala || Pan-STARRS ||  || align=right | 1.7 km || 
|-id=487 bgcolor=#E9E9E9
| 545487 ||  || — || June 24, 2011 || Haleakala || Haleakala-Faulkes ||  || align=right | 2.4 km || 
|-id=488 bgcolor=#d6d6d6
| 545488 ||  || — || December 21, 2008 || Kitt Peak || Spacewatch ||  || align=right | 2.3 km || 
|-id=489 bgcolor=#C2FFFF
| 545489 ||  || — || June 24, 2011 || Mount Lemmon || Mount Lemmon Survey || L5 || align=right | 9.3 km || 
|-id=490 bgcolor=#fefefe
| 545490 ||  || — || February 22, 2001 || Kitt Peak || Spacewatch ||  || align=right data-sort-value="0.94" | 940 m || 
|-id=491 bgcolor=#E9E9E9
| 545491 ||  || — || August 25, 2003 || Palomar || NEAT || JUN || align=right | 1.3 km || 
|-id=492 bgcolor=#E9E9E9
| 545492 ||  || — || October 8, 2002 || Palomar || NEAT ||  || align=right | 2.2 km || 
|-id=493 bgcolor=#fefefe
| 545493 ||  || — || June 26, 2011 || Mount Lemmon || Mount Lemmon Survey ||  || align=right data-sort-value="0.74" | 740 m || 
|-id=494 bgcolor=#C2FFFF
| 545494 ||  || — || June 26, 2011 || Mount Lemmon || Mount Lemmon Survey || L5 || align=right | 11 km || 
|-id=495 bgcolor=#d6d6d6
| 545495 ||  || — || July 1, 2011 || Kitt Peak || Spacewatch ||  || align=right | 2.0 km || 
|-id=496 bgcolor=#d6d6d6
| 545496 ||  || — || July 22, 2011 || Haleakala || Pan-STARRS ||  || align=right | 2.2 km || 
|-id=497 bgcolor=#fefefe
| 545497 ||  || — || December 26, 2009 || Kitt Peak || Spacewatch ||  || align=right data-sort-value="0.67" | 670 m || 
|-id=498 bgcolor=#d6d6d6
| 545498 ||  || — || July 27, 2011 || Haleakala || Pan-STARRS ||  || align=right | 2.2 km || 
|-id=499 bgcolor=#d6d6d6
| 545499 ||  || — || March 1, 2005 || Kitt Peak || Spacewatch ||  || align=right | 2.0 km || 
|-id=500 bgcolor=#d6d6d6
| 545500 ||  || — || July 29, 2011 || Sierra Stars || R. Matson ||  || align=right | 2.5 km || 
|}

545501–545600 

|-bgcolor=#C2FFFF
| 545501 ||  || — || June 12, 2009 || Kitt Peak || Spacewatch || L5 || align=right | 12 km || 
|-id=502 bgcolor=#E9E9E9
| 545502 ||  || — || July 25, 2011 || Haleakala || Pan-STARRS ||  || align=right | 1.7 km || 
|-id=503 bgcolor=#C2FFFF
| 545503 ||  || — || January 28, 2007 || Mount Lemmon || Mount Lemmon Survey || L5 || align=right | 8.3 km || 
|-id=504 bgcolor=#fefefe
| 545504 ||  || — || July 28, 2011 || Haleakala || Pan-STARRS ||  || align=right data-sort-value="0.72" | 720 m || 
|-id=505 bgcolor=#C2FFFF
| 545505 ||  || — || July 26, 2011 || Haleakala || Pan-STARRS || L5 || align=right | 8.2 km || 
|-id=506 bgcolor=#fefefe
| 545506 ||  || — || June 22, 2011 || Mount Lemmon || Mount Lemmon Survey ||  || align=right data-sort-value="0.62" | 620 m || 
|-id=507 bgcolor=#C2FFFF
| 545507 ||  || — || July 31, 2011 || Haleakala || Pan-STARRS || L5 || align=right | 8.4 km || 
|-id=508 bgcolor=#C2FFFF
| 545508 ||  || — || July 27, 2011 || Haleakala || Pan-STARRS || L5 || align=right | 9.2 km || 
|-id=509 bgcolor=#d6d6d6
| 545509 ||  || — || April 11, 2010 || Kitt Peak || Spacewatch ||  || align=right | 2.0 km || 
|-id=510 bgcolor=#E9E9E9
| 545510 ||  || — || July 28, 2011 || Haleakala || Pan-STARRS ||  || align=right | 1.8 km || 
|-id=511 bgcolor=#fefefe
| 545511 ||  || — || July 28, 2011 || Haleakala || Pan-STARRS ||  || align=right data-sort-value="0.59" | 590 m || 
|-id=512 bgcolor=#d6d6d6
| 545512 ||  || — || July 29, 2011 || Siding Spring || SSS ||  || align=right | 2.7 km || 
|-id=513 bgcolor=#d6d6d6
| 545513 ||  || — || August 19, 2001 || Cerro Tololo || Cerro Tololo Obs. ||  || align=right | 2.4 km || 
|-id=514 bgcolor=#d6d6d6
| 545514 ||  || — || July 26, 2011 || Haleakala || Pan-STARRS ||  || align=right | 3.5 km || 
|-id=515 bgcolor=#E9E9E9
| 545515 ||  || — || October 15, 2007 || Catalina || CSS ||  || align=right | 2.5 km || 
|-id=516 bgcolor=#E9E9E9
| 545516 ||  || — || August 31, 2011 || Haleakala || Pan-STARRS ||  || align=right | 1.7 km || 
|-id=517 bgcolor=#C2FFFF
| 545517 ||  || — || July 24, 2011 || Haleakala || Haleakala-Faulkes || L5 || align=right | 6.4 km || 
|-id=518 bgcolor=#fefefe
| 545518 ||  || — || July 27, 2011 || Haleakala || Pan-STARRS ||  || align=right data-sort-value="0.54" | 540 m || 
|-id=519 bgcolor=#d6d6d6
| 545519 ||  || — || May 21, 2015 || Haleakala || Pan-STARRS ||  || align=right | 2.4 km || 
|-id=520 bgcolor=#C2FFFF
| 545520 ||  || — || December 15, 2014 || Mount Lemmon || Mount Lemmon Survey || L5 || align=right | 8.2 km || 
|-id=521 bgcolor=#fefefe
| 545521 ||  || — || July 28, 2011 || Haleakala || Pan-STARRS ||  || align=right data-sort-value="0.59" | 590 m || 
|-id=522 bgcolor=#C2FFFF
| 545522 ||  || — || July 28, 2011 || Haleakala || Pan-STARRS || L5 || align=right | 6.4 km || 
|-id=523 bgcolor=#d6d6d6
| 545523 ||  || — || January 24, 2014 || Haleakala || Pan-STARRS ||  || align=right | 2.3 km || 
|-id=524 bgcolor=#d6d6d6
| 545524 ||  || — || December 27, 2013 || Kitt Peak || Spacewatch ||  || align=right | 2.2 km || 
|-id=525 bgcolor=#E9E9E9
| 545525 ||  || — || June 12, 2015 || Haleakala || Pan-STARRS ||  || align=right | 1.8 km || 
|-id=526 bgcolor=#C2FFFF
| 545526 ||  || — || July 25, 2011 || Haleakala || Pan-STARRS || L5 || align=right | 8.9 km || 
|-id=527 bgcolor=#C2FFFF
| 545527 ||  || — || July 27, 2011 || Haleakala || Pan-STARRS || L5 || align=right | 6.1 km || 
|-id=528 bgcolor=#C2FFFF
| 545528 ||  || — || July 27, 2011 || Haleakala || Pan-STARRS || L5 || align=right | 7.3 km || 
|-id=529 bgcolor=#C2FFFF
| 545529 ||  || — || July 27, 2011 || Haleakala || Pan-STARRS || L5 || align=right | 6.3 km || 
|-id=530 bgcolor=#d6d6d6
| 545530 ||  || — || June 4, 2005 || Kitt Peak || Spacewatch ||  || align=right | 3.2 km || 
|-id=531 bgcolor=#d6d6d6
| 545531 ||  || — || August 4, 2011 || Haleakala || Pan-STARRS ||  || align=right | 2.1 km || 
|-id=532 bgcolor=#d6d6d6
| 545532 ||  || — || May 23, 2001 || Cerro Tololo || J. L. Elliot, L. H. Wasserman ||  || align=right | 2.1 km || 
|-id=533 bgcolor=#C2FFFF
| 545533 ||  || — || March 31, 2008 || Mount Lemmon || Mount Lemmon Survey || L5 || align=right | 8.0 km || 
|-id=534 bgcolor=#d6d6d6
| 545534 ||  || — || August 3, 2011 || Haleakala || Pan-STARRS ||  || align=right | 2.8 km || 
|-id=535 bgcolor=#C2FFFF
| 545535 ||  || — || April 4, 2008 || Kitt Peak || Spacewatch || L5 || align=right | 11 km || 
|-id=536 bgcolor=#d6d6d6
| 545536 ||  || — || June 18, 2010 || Mount Lemmon || Mount Lemmon Survey ||  || align=right | 3.3 km || 
|-id=537 bgcolor=#d6d6d6
| 545537 ||  || — || August 30, 2011 || Haleakala || Pan-STARRS || EOS || align=right | 2.0 km || 
|-id=538 bgcolor=#C2FFFF
| 545538 ||  || — || October 27, 2014 || Haleakala || Pan-STARRS || L5 || align=right | 8.3 km || 
|-id=539 bgcolor=#C2FFFF
| 545539 ||  || — || October 9, 2013 || Mount Lemmon || Mount Lemmon Survey || L5 || align=right | 7.5 km || 
|-id=540 bgcolor=#E9E9E9
| 545540 ||  || — || August 3, 2011 || La Sagra || OAM Obs. ||  || align=right | 1.7 km || 
|-id=541 bgcolor=#d6d6d6
| 545541 ||  || — || May 11, 2015 || Mount Lemmon || Mount Lemmon Survey ||  || align=right | 1.9 km || 
|-id=542 bgcolor=#d6d6d6
| 545542 ||  || — || May 11, 2015 || Mount Lemmon || Mount Lemmon Survey ||  || align=right | 2.4 km || 
|-id=543 bgcolor=#d6d6d6
| 545543 ||  || — || November 19, 2012 || Kitt Peak || Spacewatch ||  || align=right | 2.5 km || 
|-id=544 bgcolor=#C2FFFF
| 545544 ||  || — || September 14, 2013 || Mount Lemmon || Mount Lemmon Survey || L5 || align=right | 6.7 km || 
|-id=545 bgcolor=#E9E9E9
| 545545 ||  || — || August 2, 2011 || Haleakala || Pan-STARRS ||  || align=right | 1.9 km || 
|-id=546 bgcolor=#d6d6d6
| 545546 ||  || — || September 20, 2006 || Cordell-Lorenz || D. T. Durig, A. W. Taylor ||  || align=right | 1.9 km || 
|-id=547 bgcolor=#d6d6d6
| 545547 ||  || — || August 20, 2011 || Pla D'Arguines || R. Ferrando, M. Ferrando ||  || align=right | 2.2 km || 
|-id=548 bgcolor=#E9E9E9
| 545548 ||  || — || September 18, 2003 || Kitt Peak || Spacewatch ||  || align=right | 2.1 km || 
|-id=549 bgcolor=#d6d6d6
| 545549 ||  || — || January 27, 2003 || Palomar || NEAT ||  || align=right | 4.5 km || 
|-id=550 bgcolor=#d6d6d6
| 545550 ||  || — || June 25, 2011 || Mount Lemmon || Mount Lemmon Survey ||  || align=right | 2.4 km || 
|-id=551 bgcolor=#C2FFFF
| 545551 ||  || — || August 21, 2011 || Haleakala || Pan-STARRS || L5 || align=right | 8.0 km || 
|-id=552 bgcolor=#C2FFFF
| 545552 ||  || — || April 27, 2009 || Mount Lemmon || Mount Lemmon Survey || L5 || align=right | 11 km || 
|-id=553 bgcolor=#E9E9E9
| 545553 ||  || — || August 22, 2011 || Crni Vrh || S. Matičič ||  || align=right | 2.7 km || 
|-id=554 bgcolor=#E9E9E9
| 545554 ||  || — || August 2, 2011 || Crni Vrh || J. Zakrajšek || DOR || align=right | 2.9 km || 
|-id=555 bgcolor=#fefefe
| 545555 ||  || — || November 30, 2005 || Kitt Peak || Spacewatch ||  || align=right data-sort-value="0.64" | 640 m || 
|-id=556 bgcolor=#d6d6d6
| 545556 ||  || — || June 25, 2011 || Mount Lemmon || Mount Lemmon Survey ||  || align=right | 3.5 km || 
|-id=557 bgcolor=#d6d6d6
| 545557 ||  || — || August 23, 2011 || Haleakala || Pan-STARRS ||  || align=right | 2.2 km || 
|-id=558 bgcolor=#d6d6d6
| 545558 ||  || — || October 23, 2001 || Palomar || NEAT ||  || align=right | 4.0 km || 
|-id=559 bgcolor=#d6d6d6
| 545559 ||  || — || August 23, 2011 || Haleakala || Pan-STARRS ||  || align=right | 1.9 km || 
|-id=560 bgcolor=#fefefe
| 545560 ||  || — || August 27, 2011 || Zelenchukskaya Stn || T. V. Kryachko, B. Satovski ||  || align=right data-sort-value="0.67" | 670 m || 
|-id=561 bgcolor=#d6d6d6
| 545561 ||  || — || August 26, 2011 || Piszkesteto || K. Sárneczky ||  || align=right | 2.8 km || 
|-id=562 bgcolor=#C2FFFF
| 545562 ||  || — || February 25, 2007 || Kitt Peak || Spacewatch || L5 || align=right | 6.7 km || 
|-id=563 bgcolor=#E9E9E9
| 545563 ||  || — || October 30, 2007 || Kitt Peak || Spacewatch ||  || align=right | 2.1 km || 
|-id=564 bgcolor=#C2FFFF
| 545564 Sabonis ||  ||  || August 23, 2011 || Baldone || I. Eglītis || L5 || align=right | 10 km || 
|-id=565 bgcolor=#d6d6d6
| 545565 Borysten ||  ||  || August 27, 2011 || Andrushivka || Y. Ivaščenko, P. Kyrylenko ||  || align=right | 3.1 km || 
|-id=566 bgcolor=#d6d6d6
| 545566 ||  || — || September 13, 2006 || Palomar || NEAT ||  || align=right | 3.1 km || 
|-id=567 bgcolor=#d6d6d6
| 545567 ||  || — || August 28, 2011 || Haleakala || Pan-STARRS ||  || align=right | 2.3 km || 
|-id=568 bgcolor=#d6d6d6
| 545568 ||  || — || February 20, 2015 || Haleakala || Pan-STARRS ||  || align=right | 2.8 km || 
|-id=569 bgcolor=#d6d6d6
| 545569 ||  || — || August 31, 2011 || Haleakala || Pan-STARRS ||  || align=right | 1.7 km || 
|-id=570 bgcolor=#d6d6d6
| 545570 ||  || — || August 31, 2011 || Haleakala || Pan-STARRS ||  || align=right | 2.2 km || 
|-id=571 bgcolor=#E9E9E9
| 545571 ||  || — || August 28, 2011 || Andrushivka || Y. Ivaščenko ||  || align=right | 2.5 km || 
|-id=572 bgcolor=#d6d6d6
| 545572 ||  || — || June 8, 2011 || Mount Lemmon || Mount Lemmon Survey ||  || align=right | 2.5 km || 
|-id=573 bgcolor=#d6d6d6
| 545573 ||  || — || September 28, 2006 || Kitt Peak || Spacewatch ||  || align=right | 2.9 km || 
|-id=574 bgcolor=#d6d6d6
| 545574 ||  || — || July 2, 2011 || Mount Lemmon || Mount Lemmon Survey ||  || align=right | 2.8 km || 
|-id=575 bgcolor=#E9E9E9
| 545575 ||  || — || July 28, 2011 || Haleakala || Pan-STARRS ||  || align=right | 1.5 km || 
|-id=576 bgcolor=#FA8072
| 545576 ||  || — || October 2, 2008 || Kitt Peak || Spacewatch ||  || align=right data-sort-value="0.46" | 460 m || 
|-id=577 bgcolor=#d6d6d6
| 545577 ||  || — || July 28, 2011 || Haleakala || Pan-STARRS ||  || align=right | 2.2 km || 
|-id=578 bgcolor=#C2FFFF
| 545578 ||  || — || April 6, 2008 || Kitt Peak || Spacewatch || L5 || align=right | 8.7 km || 
|-id=579 bgcolor=#C2FFFF
| 545579 ||  || — || March 29, 2008 || Kitt Peak || Spacewatch || L5 || align=right | 7.1 km || 
|-id=580 bgcolor=#C2FFFF
| 545580 ||  || — || October 8, 2012 || Haleakala || Pan-STARRS || L5 || align=right | 7.9 km || 
|-id=581 bgcolor=#C2FFFF
| 545581 ||  || — || November 29, 2014 || Haleakala || Pan-STARRS || L5 || align=right | 8.5 km || 
|-id=582 bgcolor=#d6d6d6
| 545582 ||  || — || August 23, 2011 || Haleakala || Pan-STARRS ||  || align=right | 2.6 km || 
|-id=583 bgcolor=#d6d6d6
| 545583 ||  || — || November 7, 2012 || Mount Lemmon || Mount Lemmon Survey ||  || align=right | 1.9 km || 
|-id=584 bgcolor=#d6d6d6
| 545584 ||  || — || January 31, 2014 || Haleakala || Pan-STARRS ||  || align=right | 3.0 km || 
|-id=585 bgcolor=#d6d6d6
| 545585 ||  || — || December 18, 2007 || Mount Lemmon || Mount Lemmon Survey ||  || align=right | 2.4 km || 
|-id=586 bgcolor=#d6d6d6
| 545586 ||  || — || February 9, 2014 || Kitt Peak || Spacewatch ||  || align=right | 2.5 km || 
|-id=587 bgcolor=#C2FFFF
| 545587 ||  || — || October 28, 2013 || Mount Lemmon || Mount Lemmon Survey || L5 || align=right | 6.6 km || 
|-id=588 bgcolor=#C2FFFF
| 545588 ||  || — || August 24, 2011 || Haleakala || Pan-STARRS || L5 || align=right | 7.2 km || 
|-id=589 bgcolor=#d6d6d6
| 545589 ||  || — || September 2, 2011 || Charleston || R. Holmes ||  || align=right | 2.5 km || 
|-id=590 bgcolor=#fefefe
| 545590 ||  || — || March 13, 2007 || Mount Lemmon || Mount Lemmon Survey ||  || align=right data-sort-value="0.39" | 390 m || 
|-id=591 bgcolor=#d6d6d6
| 545591 ||  || — || September 26, 2011 || Mount Lemmon || Mount Lemmon Survey || URS || align=right | 3.0 km || 
|-id=592 bgcolor=#d6d6d6
| 545592 ||  || — || September 4, 2011 || Haleakala || Pan-STARRS ||  || align=right | 3.0 km || 
|-id=593 bgcolor=#E9E9E9
| 545593 ||  || — || September 2, 2011 || Haleakala || Pan-STARRS ||  || align=right | 1.7 km || 
|-id=594 bgcolor=#d6d6d6
| 545594 ||  || — || September 4, 2011 || Kitt Peak || Spacewatch ||  || align=right | 2.3 km || 
|-id=595 bgcolor=#d6d6d6
| 545595 ||  || — || September 2, 2011 || Haleakala || Pan-STARRS ||  || align=right | 2.4 km || 
|-id=596 bgcolor=#d6d6d6
| 545596 ||  || — || September 7, 2011 || Kitt Peak || Spacewatch ||  || align=right | 2.0 km || 
|-id=597 bgcolor=#d6d6d6
| 545597 ||  || — || September 7, 2011 || Kitt Peak || Spacewatch ||  || align=right | 2.1 km || 
|-id=598 bgcolor=#C2FFFF
| 545598 ||  || — || September 2, 2011 || Haleakala || Pan-STARRS || L5 || align=right | 7.0 km || 
|-id=599 bgcolor=#E9E9E9
| 545599 ||  || — || September 4, 2011 || Haleakala || Pan-STARRS ||  || align=right | 1.9 km || 
|-id=600 bgcolor=#d6d6d6
| 545600 ||  || — || January 18, 2008 || Kitt Peak || Spacewatch ||  || align=right | 3.0 km || 
|}

545601–545700 

|-bgcolor=#d6d6d6
| 545601 ||  || — || September 26, 2006 || Mount Lemmon || Mount Lemmon Survey || TEL || align=right | 1.0 km || 
|-id=602 bgcolor=#d6d6d6
| 545602 ||  || — || September 19, 2011 || La Sagra || OAM Obs. ||  || align=right | 3.5 km || 
|-id=603 bgcolor=#d6d6d6
| 545603 ||  || — || September 18, 2011 || Catalina || CSS ||  || align=right | 2.7 km || 
|-id=604 bgcolor=#d6d6d6
| 545604 ||  || — || September 2, 2011 || Haleakala || Pan-STARRS ||  || align=right | 3.1 km || 
|-id=605 bgcolor=#d6d6d6
| 545605 ||  || — || October 30, 2006 || Catalina || CSS ||  || align=right | 3.4 km || 
|-id=606 bgcolor=#C2FFFF
| 545606 ||  || — || May 6, 2008 || Mount Lemmon || Mount Lemmon Survey || L5 || align=right | 8.9 km || 
|-id=607 bgcolor=#E9E9E9
| 545607 ||  || — || January 31, 2009 || Kitt Peak || Spacewatch ||  || align=right | 2.7 km || 
|-id=608 bgcolor=#d6d6d6
| 545608 ||  || — || September 20, 2011 || Haleakala || Pan-STARRS ||  || align=right | 1.9 km || 
|-id=609 bgcolor=#C2FFFF
| 545609 ||  || — || September 20, 2011 || Mount Lemmon || Mount Lemmon Survey || L5 || align=right | 6.9 km || 
|-id=610 bgcolor=#E9E9E9
| 545610 ||  || — || November 24, 2002 || Palomar || NEAT ||  || align=right | 3.7 km || 
|-id=611 bgcolor=#d6d6d6
| 545611 ||  || — || September 25, 2006 || Moletai || K. Černis, J. Zdanavičius ||  || align=right | 3.5 km || 
|-id=612 bgcolor=#fefefe
| 545612 ||  || — || August 25, 2001 || Anderson Mesa || LONEOS ||  || align=right data-sort-value="0.83" | 830 m || 
|-id=613 bgcolor=#d6d6d6
| 545613 ||  || — || March 24, 2003 || Kitt Peak || Spacewatch ||  || align=right | 3.1 km || 
|-id=614 bgcolor=#fefefe
| 545614 ||  || — || September 23, 2008 || Mount Lemmon || Mount Lemmon Survey ||  || align=right data-sort-value="0.63" | 630 m || 
|-id=615 bgcolor=#fefefe
| 545615 ||  || — || September 2, 2011 || Haleakala || Pan-STARRS ||  || align=right data-sort-value="0.67" | 670 m || 
|-id=616 bgcolor=#d6d6d6
| 545616 ||  || — || September 19, 2011 || Mount Lemmon || Mount Lemmon Survey ||  || align=right | 2.6 km || 
|-id=617 bgcolor=#d6d6d6
| 545617 ||  || — || September 2, 2011 || Haleakala || Pan-STARRS ||  || align=right | 2.4 km || 
|-id=618 bgcolor=#E9E9E9
| 545618 ||  || — || November 19, 2007 || Kitt Peak || Spacewatch ||  || align=right | 1.6 km || 
|-id=619 bgcolor=#d6d6d6
| 545619 Lapuska ||  ||  || September 3, 2011 || Baldone || K. Černis, I. Eglītis ||  || align=right | 2.1 km || 
|-id=620 bgcolor=#d6d6d6
| 545620 ||  || — || October 18, 2006 || Kitt Peak || Spacewatch ||  || align=right | 2.9 km || 
|-id=621 bgcolor=#d6d6d6
| 545621 ||  || — || September 23, 2011 || Mount Lemmon || Mount Lemmon Survey ||  || align=right | 2.4 km || 
|-id=622 bgcolor=#d6d6d6
| 545622 ||  || — || September 23, 2011 || Haleakala || Pan-STARRS ||  || align=right | 1.8 km || 
|-id=623 bgcolor=#d6d6d6
| 545623 ||  || — || September 23, 2011 || Haleakala || Pan-STARRS ||  || align=right | 2.7 km || 
|-id=624 bgcolor=#d6d6d6
| 545624 ||  || — || September 1, 2005 || Kitt Peak || Spacewatch ||  || align=right | 2.7 km || 
|-id=625 bgcolor=#d6d6d6
| 545625 ||  || — || October 3, 2006 || Mount Lemmon || Mount Lemmon Survey ||  || align=right | 1.6 km || 
|-id=626 bgcolor=#fefefe
| 545626 ||  || — || September 18, 2011 || Catalina || CSS ||  || align=right data-sort-value="0.76" | 760 m || 
|-id=627 bgcolor=#d6d6d6
| 545627 ||  || — || September 20, 2011 || Haleakala || Pan-STARRS ||  || align=right | 2.5 km || 
|-id=628 bgcolor=#d6d6d6
| 545628 ||  || — || August 28, 2011 || Piszkesteto || K. Sárneczky ||  || align=right | 2.6 km || 
|-id=629 bgcolor=#d6d6d6
| 545629 ||  || — || May 7, 2010 || Mount Lemmon || Mount Lemmon Survey ||  || align=right | 3.5 km || 
|-id=630 bgcolor=#d6d6d6
| 545630 ||  || — || August 25, 2011 || Piszkesteto || K. Sárneczky ||  || align=right | 2.6 km || 
|-id=631 bgcolor=#d6d6d6
| 545631 ||  || — || September 21, 2011 || Haleakala || Pan-STARRS ||  || align=right | 3.1 km || 
|-id=632 bgcolor=#d6d6d6
| 545632 ||  || — || September 23, 2011 || Haleakala || Pan-STARRS ||  || align=right | 2.2 km || 
|-id=633 bgcolor=#E9E9E9
| 545633 ||  || — || November 23, 2002 || Palomar || NEAT ||  || align=right | 3.4 km || 
|-id=634 bgcolor=#C2FFFF
| 545634 ||  || — || March 14, 2007 || Kitt Peak || Spacewatch || L5 || align=right | 7.0 km || 
|-id=635 bgcolor=#d6d6d6
| 545635 ||  || — || January 10, 2008 || Mount Lemmon || Mount Lemmon Survey ||  || align=right | 2.4 km || 
|-id=636 bgcolor=#d6d6d6
| 545636 ||  || — || September 24, 2011 || Haleakala || Pan-STARRS ||  || align=right | 2.3 km || 
|-id=637 bgcolor=#d6d6d6
| 545637 ||  || — || December 17, 2007 || Mount Lemmon || Mount Lemmon Survey ||  || align=right | 2.2 km || 
|-id=638 bgcolor=#d6d6d6
| 545638 ||  || — || August 30, 2011 || Haleakala || Pan-STARRS || EOS || align=right | 2.2 km || 
|-id=639 bgcolor=#d6d6d6
| 545639 ||  || — || September 20, 2011 || Haleakala || Pan-STARRS ||  || align=right | 2.1 km || 
|-id=640 bgcolor=#d6d6d6
| 545640 ||  || — || September 21, 2011 || Kitt Peak || Spacewatch ||  || align=right | 2.3 km || 
|-id=641 bgcolor=#d6d6d6
| 545641 ||  || — || September 21, 2011 || Kitt Peak || Spacewatch ||  || align=right | 2.8 km || 
|-id=642 bgcolor=#E9E9E9
| 545642 ||  || — || August 21, 2006 || Kitt Peak || Spacewatch || AGN || align=right | 1.4 km || 
|-id=643 bgcolor=#E9E9E9
| 545643 ||  || — || November 6, 2007 || Kitt Peak || Spacewatch ||  || align=right | 1.8 km || 
|-id=644 bgcolor=#E9E9E9
| 545644 ||  || — || September 24, 2011 || Mount Lemmon || Mount Lemmon Survey ||  || align=right | 1.9 km || 
|-id=645 bgcolor=#d6d6d6
| 545645 ||  || — || May 18, 2004 || Bergisch Gladbach || W. Bickel ||  || align=right | 3.0 km || 
|-id=646 bgcolor=#d6d6d6
| 545646 ||  || — || August 2, 2011 || Haleakala || Pan-STARRS ||  || align=right | 2.6 km || 
|-id=647 bgcolor=#d6d6d6
| 545647 ||  || — || September 23, 2011 || Crni Vrh || J. Zakrajšek ||  || align=right | 3.2 km || 
|-id=648 bgcolor=#d6d6d6
| 545648 ||  || — || November 10, 2006 || Kitt Peak || Spacewatch ||  || align=right | 3.2 km || 
|-id=649 bgcolor=#d6d6d6
| 545649 ||  || — || August 24, 2006 || Palomar || NEAT || 615 || align=right | 1.7 km || 
|-id=650 bgcolor=#d6d6d6
| 545650 ||  || — || September 24, 2011 || Catalina || CSS ||  || align=right | 3.2 km || 
|-id=651 bgcolor=#d6d6d6
| 545651 Lilyjames ||  ||  || September 25, 2011 || Mayhill || N. Falla ||  || align=right | 2.6 km || 
|-id=652 bgcolor=#FA8072
| 545652 ||  || — || September 22, 2011 || Kitt Peak || Spacewatch || H || align=right data-sort-value="0.48" | 480 m || 
|-id=653 bgcolor=#d6d6d6
| 545653 ||  || — || December 19, 2007 || Mount Lemmon || Mount Lemmon Survey ||  || align=right | 3.4 km || 
|-id=654 bgcolor=#fefefe
| 545654 ||  || — || September 20, 2011 || Kitt Peak || Spacewatch ||  || align=right data-sort-value="0.85" | 850 m || 
|-id=655 bgcolor=#d6d6d6
| 545655 ||  || — || October 4, 2006 || Mount Lemmon || Mount Lemmon Survey ||  || align=right | 3.1 km || 
|-id=656 bgcolor=#d6d6d6
| 545656 ||  || — || September 23, 2011 || Haleakala || Pan-STARRS ||  || align=right | 2.9 km || 
|-id=657 bgcolor=#d6d6d6
| 545657 ||  || — || September 23, 2011 || Kitt Peak || Spacewatch ||  || align=right | 2.7 km || 
|-id=658 bgcolor=#FA8072
| 545658 ||  || — || October 28, 2008 || Mount Lemmon || Mount Lemmon Survey ||  || align=right data-sort-value="0.39" | 390 m || 
|-id=659 bgcolor=#d6d6d6
| 545659 ||  || — || October 2, 2006 || Mount Lemmon || Mount Lemmon Survey ||  || align=right | 2.2 km || 
|-id=660 bgcolor=#d6d6d6
| 545660 ||  || — || November 12, 2006 || Mount Lemmon || Mount Lemmon Survey ||  || align=right | 2.1 km || 
|-id=661 bgcolor=#d6d6d6
| 545661 ||  || — || September 23, 2011 || Haleakala || Pan-STARRS ||  || align=right | 1.9 km || 
|-id=662 bgcolor=#d6d6d6
| 545662 ||  || — || September 18, 2006 || Kitt Peak || Spacewatch ||  || align=right | 2.2 km || 
|-id=663 bgcolor=#d6d6d6
| 545663 ||  || — || September 26, 2011 || Haleakala || Pan-STARRS ||  || align=right | 2.5 km || 
|-id=664 bgcolor=#d6d6d6
| 545664 ||  || — || September 17, 2006 || Kitt Peak || Spacewatch ||  || align=right | 1.9 km || 
|-id=665 bgcolor=#d6d6d6
| 545665 ||  || — || September 15, 2006 || Kitt Peak || Spacewatch ||  || align=right | 1.8 km || 
|-id=666 bgcolor=#d6d6d6
| 545666 ||  || — || December 19, 2007 || Mount Lemmon || Mount Lemmon Survey ||  || align=right | 3.2 km || 
|-id=667 bgcolor=#d6d6d6
| 545667 ||  || — || September 23, 2011 || Kitt Peak || Spacewatch ||  || align=right | 2.4 km || 
|-id=668 bgcolor=#d6d6d6
| 545668 ||  || — || January 10, 2008 || Mount Lemmon || Mount Lemmon Survey ||  || align=right | 3.6 km || 
|-id=669 bgcolor=#d6d6d6
| 545669 ||  || — || October 31, 2006 || Mount Lemmon || Mount Lemmon Survey ||  || align=right | 2.4 km || 
|-id=670 bgcolor=#fefefe
| 545670 ||  || — || September 17, 2004 || Kitt Peak || Spacewatch ||  || align=right data-sort-value="0.79" | 790 m || 
|-id=671 bgcolor=#d6d6d6
| 545671 ||  || — || November 15, 1995 || Kitt Peak || Spacewatch ||  || align=right | 2.4 km || 
|-id=672 bgcolor=#fefefe
| 545672 ||  || — || September 28, 2011 || Mount Lemmon || Mount Lemmon Survey ||  || align=right data-sort-value="0.54" | 540 m || 
|-id=673 bgcolor=#d6d6d6
| 545673 ||  || — || October 17, 2006 || Catalina || CSS || EOS || align=right | 2.4 km || 
|-id=674 bgcolor=#E9E9E9
| 545674 ||  || — || September 26, 2011 || Kitt Peak || Spacewatch ||  || align=right | 2.0 km || 
|-id=675 bgcolor=#fefefe
| 545675 ||  || — || July 5, 2011 || Haleakala || Pan-STARRS ||  || align=right data-sort-value="0.85" | 850 m || 
|-id=676 bgcolor=#d6d6d6
| 545676 ||  || — || September 26, 2011 || Kitt Peak || Spacewatch ||  || align=right | 2.3 km || 
|-id=677 bgcolor=#d6d6d6
| 545677 ||  || — || October 19, 2006 || Kitt Peak || L. H. Wasserman ||  || align=right | 2.7 km || 
|-id=678 bgcolor=#d6d6d6
| 545678 ||  || — || April 13, 2004 || Palomar || NEAT ||  || align=right | 4.4 km || 
|-id=679 bgcolor=#d6d6d6
| 545679 ||  || — || September 1, 2005 || Palomar || NEAT ||  || align=right | 3.0 km || 
|-id=680 bgcolor=#d6d6d6
| 545680 ||  || — || September 20, 2011 || Haleakala || Pan-STARRS ||  || align=right | 2.2 km || 
|-id=681 bgcolor=#d6d6d6
| 545681 ||  || — || September 24, 2011 || Mount Lemmon || Mount Lemmon Survey ||  || align=right | 2.8 km || 
|-id=682 bgcolor=#d6d6d6
| 545682 ||  || — || September 24, 2011 || Haleakala || Pan-STARRS ||  || align=right | 2.9 km || 
|-id=683 bgcolor=#d6d6d6
| 545683 ||  || — || August 26, 2011 || Kitt Peak || Spacewatch ||  || align=right | 2.4 km || 
|-id=684 bgcolor=#d6d6d6
| 545684 ||  || — || October 21, 1995 || Kitt Peak || Spacewatch ||  || align=right | 2.1 km || 
|-id=685 bgcolor=#fefefe
| 545685 ||  || — || September 25, 2011 || Taunus || S. Karge, R. Kling ||  || align=right data-sort-value="0.72" | 720 m || 
|-id=686 bgcolor=#d6d6d6
| 545686 ||  || — || September 4, 2011 || Haleakala || Pan-STARRS ||  || align=right | 1.9 km || 
|-id=687 bgcolor=#d6d6d6
| 545687 ||  || — || July 19, 2005 || Palomar || NEAT ||  || align=right | 3.5 km || 
|-id=688 bgcolor=#d6d6d6
| 545688 ||  || — || September 18, 2011 || Catalina || CSS ||  || align=right | 3.2 km || 
|-id=689 bgcolor=#d6d6d6
| 545689 ||  || — || March 26, 2003 || Kitt Peak || Spacewatch ||  || align=right | 3.1 km || 
|-id=690 bgcolor=#E9E9E9
| 545690 ||  || — || October 19, 2006 || Kitt Peak || L. H. Wasserman ||  || align=right | 2.1 km || 
|-id=691 bgcolor=#d6d6d6
| 545691 ||  || — || November 14, 2006 || Kitt Peak || Spacewatch ||  || align=right | 2.1 km || 
|-id=692 bgcolor=#d6d6d6
| 545692 ||  || — || September 4, 2011 || Haleakala || Pan-STARRS ||  || align=right | 3.3 km || 
|-id=693 bgcolor=#d6d6d6
| 545693 ||  || — || August 26, 2005 || Palomar || NEAT || VER || align=right | 3.0 km || 
|-id=694 bgcolor=#d6d6d6
| 545694 ||  || — || September 20, 2011 || Kitt Peak || Spacewatch ||  || align=right | 2.8 km || 
|-id=695 bgcolor=#d6d6d6
| 545695 ||  || — || August 4, 2005 || Palomar || NEAT ||  || align=right | 3.0 km || 
|-id=696 bgcolor=#d6d6d6
| 545696 ||  || — || August 28, 2006 || Kitt Peak || Spacewatch ||  || align=right | 2.1 km || 
|-id=697 bgcolor=#d6d6d6
| 545697 ||  || — || June 26, 2011 || Mount Lemmon || Mount Lemmon Survey ||  || align=right | 2.9 km || 
|-id=698 bgcolor=#d6d6d6
| 545698 ||  || — || July 3, 2005 || Palomar || NEAT || EOS || align=right | 2.6 km || 
|-id=699 bgcolor=#d6d6d6
| 545699 ||  || — || September 29, 2011 || Mount Lemmon || Mount Lemmon Survey ||  || align=right | 2.8 km || 
|-id=700 bgcolor=#d6d6d6
| 545700 ||  || — || August 27, 2005 || Palomar || NEAT ||  || align=right | 2.7 km || 
|}

545701–545800 

|-bgcolor=#d6d6d6
| 545701 ||  || — || September 27, 2011 || Bergisch Gladbach || W. Bickel ||  || align=right | 2.7 km || 
|-id=702 bgcolor=#d6d6d6
| 545702 ||  || — || September 2, 2011 || Haleakala || Pan-STARRS ||  || align=right | 2.7 km || 
|-id=703 bgcolor=#d6d6d6
| 545703 ||  || — || October 13, 2006 || Kitt Peak || Spacewatch ||  || align=right | 3.2 km || 
|-id=704 bgcolor=#d6d6d6
| 545704 ||  || — || September 26, 2011 || Mount Lemmon || Mount Lemmon Survey ||  || align=right | 2.3 km || 
|-id=705 bgcolor=#fefefe
| 545705 ||  || — || February 2, 2006 || Kitt Peak || Spacewatch ||  || align=right data-sort-value="0.60" | 600 m || 
|-id=706 bgcolor=#d6d6d6
| 545706 ||  || — || October 23, 2006 || Kitt Peak || Spacewatch ||  || align=right | 3.2 km || 
|-id=707 bgcolor=#d6d6d6
| 545707 ||  || — || September 29, 2011 || Mount Lemmon || Mount Lemmon Survey ||  || align=right | 2.2 km || 
|-id=708 bgcolor=#d6d6d6
| 545708 ||  || — || September 25, 2006 || Kitt Peak || Spacewatch ||  || align=right | 2.4 km || 
|-id=709 bgcolor=#d6d6d6
| 545709 ||  || — || February 9, 2008 || Mount Lemmon || Mount Lemmon Survey ||  || align=right | 2.7 km || 
|-id=710 bgcolor=#d6d6d6
| 545710 ||  || — || July 8, 2005 || Kitt Peak || Spacewatch ||  || align=right | 2.7 km || 
|-id=711 bgcolor=#d6d6d6
| 545711 ||  || — || August 27, 2005 || Palomar || NEAT ||  || align=right | 2.9 km || 
|-id=712 bgcolor=#E9E9E9
| 545712 ||  || — || September 25, 2011 || Haleakala || Pan-STARRS ||  || align=right | 2.3 km || 
|-id=713 bgcolor=#d6d6d6
| 545713 ||  || — || September 29, 2011 || Mount Lemmon || Mount Lemmon Survey ||  || align=right | 3.2 km || 
|-id=714 bgcolor=#d6d6d6
| 545714 ||  || — || October 1, 2005 || Mount Lemmon || Mount Lemmon Survey ||  || align=right | 2.2 km || 
|-id=715 bgcolor=#fefefe
| 545715 ||  || — || August 20, 2011 || Haleakala || Pan-STARRS ||  || align=right data-sort-value="0.52" | 520 m || 
|-id=716 bgcolor=#d6d6d6
| 545716 ||  || — || August 27, 2011 || Haleakala || Pan-STARRS ||  || align=right | 2.2 km || 
|-id=717 bgcolor=#d6d6d6
| 545717 ||  || — || July 29, 2000 || Cerro Tololo || M. W. Buie, S. D. Kern ||  || align=right | 3.0 km || 
|-id=718 bgcolor=#d6d6d6
| 545718 ||  || — || January 12, 2008 || Kitt Peak || Spacewatch ||  || align=right | 2.3 km || 
|-id=719 bgcolor=#d6d6d6
| 545719 ||  || — || October 17, 2006 || Catalina || CSS ||  || align=right | 2.4 km || 
|-id=720 bgcolor=#d6d6d6
| 545720 ||  || — || August 28, 2006 || Kitt Peak || Spacewatch ||  || align=right | 2.2 km || 
|-id=721 bgcolor=#d6d6d6
| 545721 ||  || — || February 28, 2009 || Kitt Peak || Spacewatch ||  || align=right | 2.8 km || 
|-id=722 bgcolor=#d6d6d6
| 545722 ||  || — || October 18, 2006 || Kitt Peak || Spacewatch ||  || align=right | 2.6 km || 
|-id=723 bgcolor=#E9E9E9
| 545723 ||  || — || October 20, 2007 || Mount Lemmon || Mount Lemmon Survey ||  || align=right | 1.2 km || 
|-id=724 bgcolor=#d6d6d6
| 545724 ||  || — || August 27, 2005 || Palomar || NEAT ||  || align=right | 3.2 km || 
|-id=725 bgcolor=#d6d6d6
| 545725 ||  || — || April 2, 2009 || Mount Lemmon || Mount Lemmon Survey ||  || align=right | 2.9 km || 
|-id=726 bgcolor=#d6d6d6
| 545726 ||  || — || September 29, 2011 || Mount Lemmon || Mount Lemmon Survey ||  || align=right | 3.1 km || 
|-id=727 bgcolor=#fefefe
| 545727 ||  || — || September 21, 2011 || Mount Lemmon || Mount Lemmon Survey ||  || align=right data-sort-value="0.79" | 790 m || 
|-id=728 bgcolor=#fefefe
| 545728 ||  || — || September 23, 2011 || Kitt Peak || Spacewatch || H || align=right data-sort-value="0.46" | 460 m || 
|-id=729 bgcolor=#d6d6d6
| 545729 ||  || — || September 23, 2011 || Kitt Peak || Spacewatch ||  || align=right | 2.9 km || 
|-id=730 bgcolor=#d6d6d6
| 545730 ||  || — || March 6, 2014 || Mount Lemmon || Mount Lemmon Survey ||  || align=right | 2.6 km || 
|-id=731 bgcolor=#d6d6d6
| 545731 ||  || — || September 28, 2011 || Kitt Peak || Spacewatch ||  || align=right | 2.0 km || 
|-id=732 bgcolor=#d6d6d6
| 545732 ||  || — || September 18, 2011 || Mount Lemmon || Mount Lemmon Survey ||  || align=right | 2.0 km || 
|-id=733 bgcolor=#d6d6d6
| 545733 ||  || — || May 21, 2015 || Haleakala || Pan-STARRS ||  || align=right | 2.2 km || 
|-id=734 bgcolor=#d6d6d6
| 545734 ||  || — || September 20, 2011 || Haleakala || Pan-STARRS ||  || align=right | 2.7 km || 
|-id=735 bgcolor=#fefefe
| 545735 ||  || — || September 24, 2011 || Haleakala || Pan-STARRS ||  || align=right data-sort-value="0.64" | 640 m || 
|-id=736 bgcolor=#d6d6d6
| 545736 ||  || — || September 26, 2011 || Haleakala || Pan-STARRS ||  || align=right | 2.1 km || 
|-id=737 bgcolor=#d6d6d6
| 545737 ||  || — || September 23, 2011 || Haleakala || Pan-STARRS ||  || align=right | 2.2 km || 
|-id=738 bgcolor=#d6d6d6
| 545738 ||  || — || September 29, 2011 || Mount Lemmon || Mount Lemmon Survey ||  || align=right | 1.7 km || 
|-id=739 bgcolor=#d6d6d6
| 545739 ||  || — || September 27, 2011 || Mount Lemmon || Mount Lemmon Survey ||  || align=right | 2.4 km || 
|-id=740 bgcolor=#d6d6d6
| 545740 ||  || — || January 23, 2014 || Mount Lemmon || Mount Lemmon Survey ||  || align=right | 2.8 km || 
|-id=741 bgcolor=#d6d6d6
| 545741 ||  || — || May 19, 2015 || Haleakala || Pan-STARRS ||  || align=right | 2.3 km || 
|-id=742 bgcolor=#C2FFFF
| 545742 ||  || — || April 30, 2008 || Mount Lemmon || Mount Lemmon Survey || L5 || align=right | 9.1 km || 
|-id=743 bgcolor=#d6d6d6
| 545743 ||  || — || September 24, 2011 || Mount Lemmon || Mount Lemmon Survey ||  || align=right | 2.8 km || 
|-id=744 bgcolor=#d6d6d6
| 545744 ||  || — || September 26, 2011 || Mount Lemmon || Mount Lemmon Survey ||  || align=right | 2.3 km || 
|-id=745 bgcolor=#d6d6d6
| 545745 ||  || — || January 15, 2013 || Nogales || M. Schwartz, P. R. Holvorcem ||  || align=right | 3.2 km || 
|-id=746 bgcolor=#d6d6d6
| 545746 ||  || — || March 24, 2003 || Kitt Peak || Spacewatch ||  || align=right | 3.4 km || 
|-id=747 bgcolor=#fefefe
| 545747 ||  || — || September 29, 2011 || Mount Lemmon || Mount Lemmon Survey ||  || align=right data-sort-value="0.65" | 650 m || 
|-id=748 bgcolor=#d6d6d6
| 545748 ||  || — || August 26, 2016 || Haleakala || Pan-STARRS ||  || align=right | 2.4 km || 
|-id=749 bgcolor=#d6d6d6
| 545749 ||  || — || March 24, 2014 || Haleakala || Pan-STARRS ||  || align=right | 2.3 km || 
|-id=750 bgcolor=#d6d6d6
| 545750 ||  || — || September 24, 2011 || Haleakala || Pan-STARRS ||  || align=right | 2.3 km || 
|-id=751 bgcolor=#fefefe
| 545751 ||  || — || September 25, 2011 || Haleakala || Pan-STARRS ||  || align=right data-sort-value="0.56" | 560 m || 
|-id=752 bgcolor=#d6d6d6
| 545752 ||  || — || September 27, 2011 || Mount Lemmon || Mount Lemmon Survey ||  || align=right | 2.2 km || 
|-id=753 bgcolor=#d6d6d6
| 545753 ||  || — || September 30, 2011 || Kitt Peak || Spacewatch ||  || align=right | 2.4 km || 
|-id=754 bgcolor=#d6d6d6
| 545754 ||  || — || September 24, 2011 || Haleakala || Pan-STARRS ||  || align=right | 2.3 km || 
|-id=755 bgcolor=#d6d6d6
| 545755 ||  || — || March 19, 2009 || Kitt Peak || Spacewatch ||  || align=right | 2.7 km || 
|-id=756 bgcolor=#fefefe
| 545756 ||  || — || August 14, 2001 || Haleakala || AMOS ||  || align=right data-sort-value="0.76" | 760 m || 
|-id=757 bgcolor=#d6d6d6
| 545757 ||  || — || February 24, 2009 || Catalina || CSS ||  || align=right | 3.9 km || 
|-id=758 bgcolor=#d6d6d6
| 545758 ||  || — || August 29, 2005 || Palomar || NEAT ||  || align=right | 3.8 km || 
|-id=759 bgcolor=#d6d6d6
| 545759 ||  || — || March 31, 2009 || Mount Lemmon || Mount Lemmon Survey ||  || align=right | 2.2 km || 
|-id=760 bgcolor=#d6d6d6
| 545760 ||  || — || April 12, 2004 || Kitt Peak || Spacewatch ||  || align=right | 2.3 km || 
|-id=761 bgcolor=#d6d6d6
| 545761 ||  || — || May 19, 2015 || Haleakala || Pan-STARRS ||  || align=right | 1.9 km || 
|-id=762 bgcolor=#d6d6d6
| 545762 ||  || — || March 21, 2009 || Kitt Peak || Spacewatch ||  || align=right | 2.6 km || 
|-id=763 bgcolor=#d6d6d6
| 545763 ||  || — || November 15, 2006 || Kitt Peak || Spacewatch ||  || align=right | 2.5 km || 
|-id=764 bgcolor=#d6d6d6
| 545764 ||  || — || October 18, 2011 || Mount Lemmon || Mount Lemmon Survey ||  || align=right | 2.7 km || 
|-id=765 bgcolor=#d6d6d6
| 545765 ||  || — || October 18, 2011 || Mount Lemmon || Mount Lemmon Survey || VER || align=right | 2.7 km || 
|-id=766 bgcolor=#d6d6d6
| 545766 ||  || — || July 30, 2005 || Palomar || NEAT || EOS || align=right | 2.3 km || 
|-id=767 bgcolor=#d6d6d6
| 545767 ||  || — || September 1, 2005 || Palomar || NEAT || TIR || align=right | 3.5 km || 
|-id=768 bgcolor=#d6d6d6
| 545768 ||  || — || September 2, 2011 || Haleakala || Pan-STARRS ||  || align=right | 2.5 km || 
|-id=769 bgcolor=#d6d6d6
| 545769 ||  || — || January 16, 2008 || Mount Lemmon || Mount Lemmon Survey ||  || align=right | 3.1 km || 
|-id=770 bgcolor=#d6d6d6
| 545770 ||  || — || October 16, 2011 || Haleakala || Pan-STARRS ||  || align=right | 3.0 km || 
|-id=771 bgcolor=#d6d6d6
| 545771 ||  || — || October 1, 2011 || Kitt Peak || Spacewatch ||  || align=right | 2.4 km || 
|-id=772 bgcolor=#d6d6d6
| 545772 ||  || — || August 31, 2005 || Anderson Mesa || LONEOS ||  || align=right | 3.4 km || 
|-id=773 bgcolor=#d6d6d6
| 545773 ||  || — || August 29, 2005 || Campo Imperatore || A. Boattini ||  || align=right | 3.1 km || 
|-id=774 bgcolor=#d6d6d6
| 545774 ||  || — || December 21, 2000 || Kitt Peak || D. Team ||  || align=right | 3.0 km || 
|-id=775 bgcolor=#d6d6d6
| 545775 ||  || — || July 11, 2005 || Mount Lemmon || Mount Lemmon Survey ||  || align=right | 2.3 km || 
|-id=776 bgcolor=#d6d6d6
| 545776 ||  || — || October 19, 2011 || Mount Lemmon || Mount Lemmon Survey ||  || align=right | 3.1 km || 
|-id=777 bgcolor=#d6d6d6
| 545777 ||  || — || January 19, 2008 || Mount Lemmon || Mount Lemmon Survey ||  || align=right | 2.3 km || 
|-id=778 bgcolor=#fefefe
| 545778 ||  || — || October 19, 2011 || Mount Lemmon || Mount Lemmon Survey ||  || align=right data-sort-value="0.68" | 680 m || 
|-id=779 bgcolor=#d6d6d6
| 545779 ||  || — || September 30, 2006 || Catalina || CSS ||  || align=right | 1.8 km || 
|-id=780 bgcolor=#fefefe
| 545780 ||  || — || January 18, 2009 || Kitt Peak || Spacewatch ||  || align=right data-sort-value="0.66" | 660 m || 
|-id=781 bgcolor=#d6d6d6
| 545781 ||  || — || October 18, 2011 || Kitt Peak || Spacewatch ||  || align=right | 2.3 km || 
|-id=782 bgcolor=#d6d6d6
| 545782 ||  || — || September 21, 2011 || Les Engarouines || L. Bernasconi ||  || align=right | 2.7 km || 
|-id=783 bgcolor=#d6d6d6
| 545783 ||  || — || October 18, 2011 || Kitt Peak || Spacewatch ||  || align=right | 2.1 km || 
|-id=784 bgcolor=#d6d6d6
| 545784 Kelemenjános ||  ||  || October 18, 2011 || Piszkesteto || K. Sárneczky, A. Szing || EOS || align=right | 1.9 km || 
|-id=785 bgcolor=#FA8072
| 545785 ||  || — || September 24, 2011 || Haleakala || Pan-STARRS ||  || align=right data-sort-value="0.91" | 910 m || 
|-id=786 bgcolor=#fefefe
| 545786 ||  || — || September 23, 2011 || Haleakala || Pan-STARRS ||  || align=right data-sort-value="0.75" | 750 m || 
|-id=787 bgcolor=#FA8072
| 545787 ||  || — || October 20, 2011 || Siding Spring || SSS ||  || align=right data-sort-value="0.54" | 540 m || 
|-id=788 bgcolor=#d6d6d6
| 545788 ||  || — || September 28, 2011 || Kitt Peak || Spacewatch ||  || align=right | 2.3 km || 
|-id=789 bgcolor=#d6d6d6
| 545789 ||  || — || October 13, 2006 || Kitt Peak || Spacewatch ||  || align=right | 2.8 km || 
|-id=790 bgcolor=#d6d6d6
| 545790 ||  || — || September 29, 2011 || Mount Lemmon || Mount Lemmon Survey ||  || align=right | 2.5 km || 
|-id=791 bgcolor=#d6d6d6
| 545791 ||  || — || August 5, 2005 || Palomar || NEAT ||  || align=right | 3.9 km || 
|-id=792 bgcolor=#d6d6d6
| 545792 ||  || — || September 1, 2005 || Wrightwood || J. W. Young || EOS || align=right | 2.2 km || 
|-id=793 bgcolor=#d6d6d6
| 545793 ||  || — || September 6, 2010 || Mount Lemmon || Mount Lemmon Survey ||  || align=right | 3.9 km || 
|-id=794 bgcolor=#d6d6d6
| 545794 ||  || — || October 20, 2011 || Mount Lemmon || Mount Lemmon Survey ||  || align=right | 2.4 km || 
|-id=795 bgcolor=#d6d6d6
| 545795 ||  || — || October 5, 2005 || Catalina || CSS ||  || align=right | 3.8 km || 
|-id=796 bgcolor=#fefefe
| 545796 ||  || — || January 28, 2006 || Mount Lemmon || Mount Lemmon Survey ||  || align=right data-sort-value="0.69" | 690 m || 
|-id=797 bgcolor=#fefefe
| 545797 ||  || — || September 22, 2011 || Kitt Peak || Spacewatch ||  || align=right data-sort-value="0.63" | 630 m || 
|-id=798 bgcolor=#d6d6d6
| 545798 ||  || — || October 21, 2011 || Mount Lemmon || Mount Lemmon Survey ||  || align=right | 3.0 km || 
|-id=799 bgcolor=#d6d6d6
| 545799 ||  || — || September 28, 2011 || Mount Lemmon || Mount Lemmon Survey ||  || align=right | 2.4 km || 
|-id=800 bgcolor=#d6d6d6
| 545800 ||  || — || September 30, 2011 || Kitt Peak || Spacewatch ||  || align=right | 2.8 km || 
|}

545801–545900 

|-bgcolor=#d6d6d6
| 545801 ||  || — || October 20, 2011 || Kitt Peak || Spacewatch ||  || align=right | 3.3 km || 
|-id=802 bgcolor=#d6d6d6
| 545802 ||  || — || October 20, 2011 || Mount Lemmon || Mount Lemmon Survey ||  || align=right | 2.5 km || 
|-id=803 bgcolor=#d6d6d6
| 545803 ||  || — || July 31, 2005 || Palomar || NEAT ||  || align=right | 3.7 km || 
|-id=804 bgcolor=#d6d6d6
| 545804 ||  || — || September 21, 2011 || Kitt Peak || Spacewatch ||  || align=right | 2.4 km || 
|-id=805 bgcolor=#d6d6d6
| 545805 ||  || — || October 21, 2011 || Mount Lemmon || Mount Lemmon Survey ||  || align=right | 2.5 km || 
|-id=806 bgcolor=#d6d6d6
| 545806 ||  || — || September 29, 2005 || Mount Lemmon || Mount Lemmon Survey || THM || align=right | 1.9 km || 
|-id=807 bgcolor=#d6d6d6
| 545807 ||  || — || October 21, 2011 || Kitt Peak || Spacewatch || THM || align=right | 2.8 km || 
|-id=808 bgcolor=#d6d6d6
| 545808 ||  || — || June 14, 2005 || Mount Lemmon || Mount Lemmon Survey ||  || align=right | 2.8 km || 
|-id=809 bgcolor=#d6d6d6
| 545809 ||  || — || May 21, 2015 || Haleakala || Pan-STARRS ||  || align=right | 3.2 km || 
|-id=810 bgcolor=#d6d6d6
| 545810 ||  || — || September 18, 2011 || Mount Lemmon || Mount Lemmon Survey ||  || align=right | 3.5 km || 
|-id=811 bgcolor=#d6d6d6
| 545811 ||  || — || November 24, 2006 || Catalina || CSS ||  || align=right | 3.0 km || 
|-id=812 bgcolor=#d6d6d6
| 545812 ||  || — || September 28, 2011 || Mount Lemmon || Mount Lemmon Survey ||  || align=right | 3.4 km || 
|-id=813 bgcolor=#d6d6d6
| 545813 ||  || — || July 29, 2005 || Palomar || NEAT ||  || align=right | 4.5 km || 
|-id=814 bgcolor=#d6d6d6
| 545814 ||  || — || February 8, 2008 || Mount Lemmon || Mount Lemmon Survey ||  || align=right | 2.1 km || 
|-id=815 bgcolor=#fefefe
| 545815 ||  || — || October 19, 2011 || Mount Lemmon || Mount Lemmon Survey ||  || align=right data-sort-value="0.68" | 680 m || 
|-id=816 bgcolor=#d6d6d6
| 545816 ||  || — || October 20, 2011 || Kitt Peak || Spacewatch ||  || align=right | 2.6 km || 
|-id=817 bgcolor=#d6d6d6
| 545817 ||  || — || September 23, 2011 || Mount Lemmon || Mount Lemmon Survey ||  || align=right | 2.8 km || 
|-id=818 bgcolor=#d6d6d6
| 545818 ||  || — || November 23, 2006 || Kitt Peak || Spacewatch ||  || align=right | 2.6 km || 
|-id=819 bgcolor=#d6d6d6
| 545819 ||  || — || September 24, 2011 || Haleakala || Pan-STARRS ||  || align=right | 2.5 km || 
|-id=820 bgcolor=#d6d6d6
| 545820 ||  || — || April 17, 2009 || Kitt Peak || Spacewatch ||  || align=right | 3.4 km || 
|-id=821 bgcolor=#d6d6d6
| 545821 ||  || — || October 19, 2011 || Kitt Peak || Spacewatch ||  || align=right | 2.7 km || 
|-id=822 bgcolor=#d6d6d6
| 545822 ||  || — || October 20, 2011 || Mount Lemmon || Mount Lemmon Survey ||  || align=right | 2.2 km || 
|-id=823 bgcolor=#d6d6d6
| 545823 ||  || — || July 7, 2005 || Kitt Peak || Spacewatch ||  || align=right | 2.5 km || 
|-id=824 bgcolor=#d6d6d6
| 545824 ||  || — || October 23, 2011 || Haleakala || Pan-STARRS ||  || align=right | 2.3 km || 
|-id=825 bgcolor=#d6d6d6
| 545825 ||  || — || October 22, 2011 || Kitt Peak || Spacewatch ||  || align=right | 2.3 km || 
|-id=826 bgcolor=#d6d6d6
| 545826 ||  || — || August 4, 2005 || Palomar || NEAT ||  || align=right | 2.8 km || 
|-id=827 bgcolor=#d6d6d6
| 545827 ||  || — || October 24, 2011 || Mount Lemmon || Mount Lemmon Survey ||  || align=right | 2.5 km || 
|-id=828 bgcolor=#d6d6d6
| 545828 ||  || — || October 1, 2011 || Piszkesteto || K. Sárneczky ||  || align=right | 3.1 km || 
|-id=829 bgcolor=#fefefe
| 545829 ||  || — || October 24, 2011 || Tarleton State Uni || M. Hibbs ||  || align=right data-sort-value="0.65" | 650 m || 
|-id=830 bgcolor=#d6d6d6
| 545830 ||  || — || May 27, 2009 || Mount Lemmon || Mount Lemmon Survey ||  || align=right | 3.9 km || 
|-id=831 bgcolor=#d6d6d6
| 545831 ||  || — || August 31, 2005 || Palomar || NEAT ||  || align=right | 3.4 km || 
|-id=832 bgcolor=#d6d6d6
| 545832 ||  || — || October 26, 2011 || Haleakala || Pan-STARRS ||  || align=right | 3.2 km || 
|-id=833 bgcolor=#d6d6d6
| 545833 ||  || — || September 20, 2011 || Mount Lemmon || Mount Lemmon Survey ||  || align=right | 2.0 km || 
|-id=834 bgcolor=#d6d6d6
| 545834 ||  || — || October 1, 2011 || Kitt Peak || Spacewatch ||  || align=right | 2.8 km || 
|-id=835 bgcolor=#E9E9E9
| 545835 ||  || — || October 21, 2011 || Haleakala || Pan-STARRS ||  || align=right | 1.7 km || 
|-id=836 bgcolor=#d6d6d6
| 545836 ||  || — || October 4, 2006 || Mount Lemmon || Mount Lemmon Survey ||  || align=right | 2.5 km || 
|-id=837 bgcolor=#d6d6d6
| 545837 ||  || — || September 23, 2011 || Kitt Peak || Spacewatch ||  || align=right | 2.9 km || 
|-id=838 bgcolor=#d6d6d6
| 545838 ||  || — || September 29, 2011 || Piszkesteto || K. Sárneczky || VER || align=right | 2.4 km || 
|-id=839 bgcolor=#E9E9E9
| 545839 Hernánletelier ||  ||  || September 21, 2011 || Zelenchukskaya Stn || T. V. Kryachko, B. Satovski ||  || align=right | 2.2 km || 
|-id=840 bgcolor=#FA8072
| 545840 ||  || — || July 27, 2001 || Anderson Mesa || LONEOS ||  || align=right data-sort-value="0.65" | 650 m || 
|-id=841 bgcolor=#E9E9E9
| 545841 ||  || — || September 22, 2011 || Catalina || CSS ||  || align=right | 1.6 km || 
|-id=842 bgcolor=#d6d6d6
| 545842 ||  || — || October 23, 2011 || Haleakala || Pan-STARRS ||  || align=right | 2.3 km || 
|-id=843 bgcolor=#d6d6d6
| 545843 ||  || — || October 20, 2011 || Mount Lemmon || Mount Lemmon Survey ||  || align=right | 2.7 km || 
|-id=844 bgcolor=#fefefe
| 545844 ||  || — || October 24, 2011 || Kitt Peak || Spacewatch ||  || align=right data-sort-value="0.56" | 560 m || 
|-id=845 bgcolor=#d6d6d6
| 545845 ||  || — || March 31, 2009 || Mount Lemmon || Mount Lemmon Survey ||  || align=right | 3.5 km || 
|-id=846 bgcolor=#fefefe
| 545846 ||  || — || October 25, 2011 || Haleakala || Pan-STARRS ||  || align=right data-sort-value="0.94" | 940 m || 
|-id=847 bgcolor=#d6d6d6
| 545847 ||  || — || December 13, 2006 || Kitt Peak || Spacewatch ||  || align=right | 2.9 km || 
|-id=848 bgcolor=#fefefe
| 545848 ||  || — || September 24, 2011 || Haleakala || Pan-STARRS ||  || align=right data-sort-value="0.60" | 600 m || 
|-id=849 bgcolor=#d6d6d6
| 545849 ||  || — || September 24, 2011 || Mount Lemmon || Mount Lemmon Survey ||  || align=right | 2.9 km || 
|-id=850 bgcolor=#d6d6d6
| 545850 ||  || — || September 2, 2005 || Palomar || NEAT ||  || align=right | 3.5 km || 
|-id=851 bgcolor=#FA8072
| 545851 ||  || — || March 17, 2009 || Mount Lemmon || Mount Lemmon Survey ||  || align=right data-sort-value="0.83" | 830 m || 
|-id=852 bgcolor=#FA8072
| 545852 ||  || — || October 9, 2008 || Mount Lemmon || Mount Lemmon Survey ||  || align=right data-sort-value="0.50" | 500 m || 
|-id=853 bgcolor=#fefefe
| 545853 ||  || — || December 31, 2008 || Kitt Peak || Spacewatch ||  || align=right data-sort-value="0.78" | 780 m || 
|-id=854 bgcolor=#d6d6d6
| 545854 ||  || — || September 30, 2011 || Kitt Peak || Spacewatch ||  || align=right | 2.5 km || 
|-id=855 bgcolor=#d6d6d6
| 545855 ||  || — || May 31, 2009 || Mount Lemmon || Mount Lemmon Survey ||  || align=right | 2.8 km || 
|-id=856 bgcolor=#d6d6d6
| 545856 ||  || — || October 24, 2011 || Mount Lemmon || Mount Lemmon Survey ||  || align=right | 3.5 km || 
|-id=857 bgcolor=#d6d6d6
| 545857 ||  || — || October 24, 2011 || Mount Lemmon || Mount Lemmon Survey ||  || align=right | 2.2 km || 
|-id=858 bgcolor=#d6d6d6
| 545858 ||  || — || August 31, 2005 || Kitt Peak || Spacewatch ||  || align=right | 2.4 km || 
|-id=859 bgcolor=#d6d6d6
| 545859 ||  || — || October 24, 2011 || Mount Lemmon || Mount Lemmon Survey ||  || align=right | 2.7 km || 
|-id=860 bgcolor=#d6d6d6
| 545860 ||  || — || September 28, 2011 || Kitt Peak || Spacewatch ||  || align=right | 2.7 km || 
|-id=861 bgcolor=#d6d6d6
| 545861 ||  || — || February 26, 2008 || Kitt Peak || Spacewatch ||  || align=right | 2.4 km || 
|-id=862 bgcolor=#d6d6d6
| 545862 ||  || — || October 29, 2006 || Kitt Peak || Spacewatch ||  || align=right | 2.3 km || 
|-id=863 bgcolor=#d6d6d6
| 545863 ||  || — || October 19, 2011 || Kitt Peak || Spacewatch ||  || align=right | 2.9 km || 
|-id=864 bgcolor=#d6d6d6
| 545864 ||  || — || September 3, 2010 || Mount Lemmon || Mount Lemmon Survey ||  || align=right | 3.4 km || 
|-id=865 bgcolor=#d6d6d6
| 545865 ||  || — || October 24, 2011 || Haleakala || Pan-STARRS ||  || align=right | 2.4 km || 
|-id=866 bgcolor=#d6d6d6
| 545866 ||  || — || September 24, 2011 || Mount Lemmon || Mount Lemmon Survey ||  || align=right | 2.5 km || 
|-id=867 bgcolor=#fefefe
| 545867 ||  || — || October 18, 2011 || Kitt Peak || Spacewatch ||  || align=right data-sort-value="0.55" | 550 m || 
|-id=868 bgcolor=#fefefe
| 545868 ||  || — || April 15, 2007 || Kitt Peak || Spacewatch ||  || align=right data-sort-value="0.52" | 520 m || 
|-id=869 bgcolor=#FA8072
| 545869 ||  || — || August 29, 2001 || Palomar || NEAT ||  || align=right data-sort-value="0.73" | 730 m || 
|-id=870 bgcolor=#fefefe
| 545870 ||  || — || September 24, 2006 || Catalina || CSS || H || align=right data-sort-value="0.66" | 660 m || 
|-id=871 bgcolor=#d6d6d6
| 545871 ||  || — || October 26, 2011 || Haleakala || Pan-STARRS ||  || align=right | 3.2 km || 
|-id=872 bgcolor=#d6d6d6
| 545872 ||  || — || September 29, 2011 || Kitt Peak || Spacewatch ||  || align=right | 2.7 km || 
|-id=873 bgcolor=#d6d6d6
| 545873 ||  || — || October 24, 2011 || Haleakala || Pan-STARRS ||  || align=right | 2.5 km || 
|-id=874 bgcolor=#d6d6d6
| 545874 ||  || — || October 30, 2005 || Kitt Peak || Spacewatch ||  || align=right | 3.0 km || 
|-id=875 bgcolor=#fefefe
| 545875 ||  || — || October 25, 2011 || Haleakala || Pan-STARRS ||  || align=right data-sort-value="0.67" | 670 m || 
|-id=876 bgcolor=#fefefe
| 545876 ||  || — || October 26, 2011 || Haleakala || Pan-STARRS ||  || align=right data-sort-value="0.61" | 610 m || 
|-id=877 bgcolor=#d6d6d6
| 545877 ||  || — || September 24, 2011 || Haleakala || Pan-STARRS ||  || align=right | 2.3 km || 
|-id=878 bgcolor=#fefefe
| 545878 ||  || — || September 28, 2011 || Kitt Peak || Spacewatch ||  || align=right data-sort-value="0.46" | 460 m || 
|-id=879 bgcolor=#d6d6d6
| 545879 ||  || — || October 19, 2011 || Kitt Peak || Spacewatch ||  || align=right | 2.6 km || 
|-id=880 bgcolor=#d6d6d6
| 545880 ||  || — || October 30, 2011 || Mount Lemmon || Mount Lemmon Survey ||  || align=right | 2.9 km || 
|-id=881 bgcolor=#d6d6d6
| 545881 ||  || — || April 26, 2004 || Kitt Peak || Spacewatch ||  || align=right | 2.5 km || 
|-id=882 bgcolor=#fefefe
| 545882 ||  || — || December 18, 2004 || Mount Lemmon || Mount Lemmon Survey ||  || align=right data-sort-value="0.64" | 640 m || 
|-id=883 bgcolor=#d6d6d6
| 545883 ||  || — || September 29, 2005 || Catalina || CSS ||  || align=right | 2.8 km || 
|-id=884 bgcolor=#d6d6d6
| 545884 ||  || — || October 20, 2011 || Kitt Peak || Spacewatch ||  || align=right | 3.2 km || 
|-id=885 bgcolor=#d6d6d6
| 545885 ||  || — || December 24, 2006 || Kitt Peak || Spacewatch ||  || align=right | 3.5 km || 
|-id=886 bgcolor=#d6d6d6
| 545886 ||  || — || October 28, 2011 || Mount Lemmon || Mount Lemmon Survey ||  || align=right | 2.6 km || 
|-id=887 bgcolor=#fefefe
| 545887 ||  || — || September 24, 2011 || Haleakala || Pan-STARRS ||  || align=right data-sort-value="0.64" | 640 m || 
|-id=888 bgcolor=#d6d6d6
| 545888 ||  || — || September 24, 2011 || Haleakala || Pan-STARRS ||  || align=right | 2.8 km || 
|-id=889 bgcolor=#d6d6d6
| 545889 ||  || — || October 26, 2011 || Kitt Peak || Spacewatch ||  || align=right | 2.5 km || 
|-id=890 bgcolor=#fefefe
| 545890 ||  || — || October 26, 2011 || Haleakala || Pan-STARRS ||  || align=right data-sort-value="0.55" | 550 m || 
|-id=891 bgcolor=#d6d6d6
| 545891 ||  || — || September 4, 2011 || Haleakala || Pan-STARRS ||  || align=right | 2.9 km || 
|-id=892 bgcolor=#E9E9E9
| 545892 ||  || — || December 17, 2007 || Mount Lemmon || Mount Lemmon Survey ||  || align=right | 1.9 km || 
|-id=893 bgcolor=#d6d6d6
| 545893 ||  || — || September 28, 2011 || Kitt Peak || Spacewatch ||  || align=right | 3.1 km || 
|-id=894 bgcolor=#E9E9E9
| 545894 ||  || — || October 31, 2011 || Mount Lemmon || Mount Lemmon Survey ||  || align=right | 1.9 km || 
|-id=895 bgcolor=#d6d6d6
| 545895 ||  || — || August 27, 2005 || Palomar || NEAT ||  || align=right | 3.6 km || 
|-id=896 bgcolor=#d6d6d6
| 545896 ||  || — || September 24, 2011 || Haleakala || Pan-STARRS ||  || align=right | 3.3 km || 
|-id=897 bgcolor=#E9E9E9
| 545897 ||  || — || September 20, 2011 || Kitt Peak || Spacewatch ||  || align=right | 1.9 km || 
|-id=898 bgcolor=#d6d6d6
| 545898 ||  || — || September 23, 2011 || Kitt Peak || Spacewatch ||  || align=right | 3.3 km || 
|-id=899 bgcolor=#d6d6d6
| 545899 ||  || — || April 24, 2009 || Mount Lemmon || Mount Lemmon Survey ||  || align=right | 3.2 km || 
|-id=900 bgcolor=#fefefe
| 545900 ||  || — || March 18, 2010 || Kitt Peak || Spacewatch ||  || align=right data-sort-value="0.61" | 610 m || 
|}

545901–546000 

|-bgcolor=#d6d6d6
| 545901 ||  || — || April 1, 2009 || Kitt Peak || Spacewatch ||  || align=right | 2.6 km || 
|-id=902 bgcolor=#fefefe
| 545902 ||  || — || October 30, 2011 || Kitt Peak || Spacewatch ||  || align=right data-sort-value="0.65" | 650 m || 
|-id=903 bgcolor=#d6d6d6
| 545903 ||  || — || August 26, 2005 || Palomar || NEAT ||  || align=right | 2.5 km || 
|-id=904 bgcolor=#d6d6d6
| 545904 ||  || — || October 30, 2011 || Kitt Peak || Spacewatch ||  || align=right | 3.3 km || 
|-id=905 bgcolor=#d6d6d6
| 545905 ||  || — || October 31, 2011 || Mayhill-ISON || L. Elenin ||  || align=right | 3.2 km || 
|-id=906 bgcolor=#fefefe
| 545906 ||  || — || October 31, 2011 || Bergisch Gladbach || W. Bickel ||  || align=right data-sort-value="0.78" | 780 m || 
|-id=907 bgcolor=#fefefe
| 545907 ||  || — || October 28, 2011 || Atacama || IAA-AI || H || align=right data-sort-value="0.62" | 620 m || 
|-id=908 bgcolor=#d6d6d6
| 545908 ||  || — || August 26, 2005 || Palomar || NEAT ||  || align=right | 2.9 km || 
|-id=909 bgcolor=#d6d6d6
| 545909 ||  || — || July 28, 2005 || Palomar || NEAT ||  || align=right | 3.3 km || 
|-id=910 bgcolor=#d6d6d6
| 545910 ||  || — || October 22, 2011 || Mount Lemmon || Mount Lemmon Survey ||  || align=right | 2.9 km || 
|-id=911 bgcolor=#d6d6d6
| 545911 ||  || — || November 2, 2000 || Kitt Peak || Spacewatch ||  || align=right | 2.4 km || 
|-id=912 bgcolor=#d6d6d6
| 545912 ||  || — || October 23, 2011 || Mount Lemmon || Mount Lemmon Survey ||  || align=right | 2.5 km || 
|-id=913 bgcolor=#d6d6d6
| 545913 ||  || — || September 1, 2005 || Palomar || NEAT ||  || align=right | 3.4 km || 
|-id=914 bgcolor=#d6d6d6
| 545914 ||  || — || October 21, 2006 || Mount Lemmon || Mount Lemmon Survey ||  || align=right | 4.3 km || 
|-id=915 bgcolor=#d6d6d6
| 545915 ||  || — || February 11, 2008 || Kitt Peak || Spacewatch ||  || align=right | 3.5 km || 
|-id=916 bgcolor=#d6d6d6
| 545916 ||  || — || October 28, 2011 || Mount Lemmon || Mount Lemmon Survey ||  || align=right | 2.2 km || 
|-id=917 bgcolor=#d6d6d6
| 545917 ||  || — || September 25, 2011 || Haleakala || Pan-STARRS ||  || align=right | 2.5 km || 
|-id=918 bgcolor=#d6d6d6
| 545918 ||  || — || August 26, 2011 || Kitt Peak || Spacewatch ||  || align=right | 3.4 km || 
|-id=919 bgcolor=#d6d6d6
| 545919 ||  || — || September 23, 2011 || Kitt Peak || Spacewatch ||  || align=right | 3.1 km || 
|-id=920 bgcolor=#d6d6d6
| 545920 ||  || — || October 17, 2006 || Mount Lemmon || Mount Lemmon Survey ||  || align=right | 3.3 km || 
|-id=921 bgcolor=#d6d6d6
| 545921 ||  || — || September 30, 2011 || Kitt Peak || Spacewatch ||  || align=right | 2.7 km || 
|-id=922 bgcolor=#d6d6d6
| 545922 ||  || — || September 28, 2011 || Mount Lemmon || Mount Lemmon Survey ||  || align=right | 2.4 km || 
|-id=923 bgcolor=#d6d6d6
| 545923 ||  || — || March 19, 2009 || Mount Lemmon || Mount Lemmon Survey ||  || align=right | 2.8 km || 
|-id=924 bgcolor=#d6d6d6
| 545924 ||  || — || November 17, 2006 || Kitt Peak || Spacewatch ||  || align=right | 3.4 km || 
|-id=925 bgcolor=#d6d6d6
| 545925 ||  || — || September 28, 2011 || Mount Lemmon || Mount Lemmon Survey ||  || align=right | 2.2 km || 
|-id=926 bgcolor=#fefefe
| 545926 ||  || — || October 19, 2011 || Mount Lemmon || Mount Lemmon Survey ||  || align=right data-sort-value="0.57" | 570 m || 
|-id=927 bgcolor=#d6d6d6
| 545927 ||  || — || September 22, 2011 || Kitt Peak || Spacewatch ||  || align=right | 2.6 km || 
|-id=928 bgcolor=#fefefe
| 545928 ||  || — || January 16, 2009 || Mount Lemmon || Mount Lemmon Survey ||  || align=right data-sort-value="0.81" | 810 m || 
|-id=929 bgcolor=#d6d6d6
| 545929 ||  || — || October 20, 2011 || Kitt Peak || Spacewatch ||  || align=right | 3.4 km || 
|-id=930 bgcolor=#d6d6d6
| 545930 ||  || — || September 28, 2011 || Kitt Peak || Spacewatch ||  || align=right | 2.5 km || 
|-id=931 bgcolor=#E9E9E9
| 545931 ||  || — || December 3, 2007 || Kitt Peak || Spacewatch ||  || align=right | 1.9 km || 
|-id=932 bgcolor=#d6d6d6
| 545932 ||  || — || May 19, 2010 || Mount Lemmon || Mount Lemmon Survey ||  || align=right | 2.5 km || 
|-id=933 bgcolor=#d6d6d6
| 545933 ||  || — || October 21, 2011 || McGraw-Hill || R. Campbell ||  || align=right | 2.4 km || 
|-id=934 bgcolor=#d6d6d6
| 545934 ||  || — || October 22, 2011 || Mount Lemmon || Mount Lemmon Survey ||  || align=right | 2.4 km || 
|-id=935 bgcolor=#d6d6d6
| 545935 ||  || — || September 11, 2005 || Kitt Peak || Spacewatch ||  || align=right | 2.4 km || 
|-id=936 bgcolor=#d6d6d6
| 545936 ||  || — || January 18, 2008 || Kitt Peak || Spacewatch ||  || align=right | 2.8 km || 
|-id=937 bgcolor=#d6d6d6
| 545937 ||  || — || October 23, 2011 || Mount Lemmon || Mount Lemmon Survey ||  || align=right | 2.1 km || 
|-id=938 bgcolor=#d6d6d6
| 545938 ||  || — || October 24, 2011 || Kitt Peak || Spacewatch ||  || align=right | 2.5 km || 
|-id=939 bgcolor=#fefefe
| 545939 ||  || — || January 3, 2009 || Kitt Peak || Spacewatch ||  || align=right data-sort-value="0.60" | 600 m || 
|-id=940 bgcolor=#d6d6d6
| 545940 ||  || — || November 27, 2006 || Mount Lemmon || Mount Lemmon Survey ||  || align=right | 3.4 km || 
|-id=941 bgcolor=#d6d6d6
| 545941 ||  || — || August 26, 2005 || Palomar || NEAT ||  || align=right | 2.5 km || 
|-id=942 bgcolor=#d6d6d6
| 545942 ||  || — || October 24, 2011 || Haleakala || Pan-STARRS ||  || align=right | 3.1 km || 
|-id=943 bgcolor=#d6d6d6
| 545943 ||  || — || September 24, 2005 || Kitt Peak || Spacewatch ||  || align=right | 3.0 km || 
|-id=944 bgcolor=#d6d6d6
| 545944 ||  || — || September 24, 2011 || Haleakala || Pan-STARRS ||  || align=right | 2.5 km || 
|-id=945 bgcolor=#d6d6d6
| 545945 ||  || — || September 25, 2011 || Haleakala || Pan-STARRS ||  || align=right | 2.4 km || 
|-id=946 bgcolor=#d6d6d6
| 545946 ||  || — || June 17, 2010 || Nogales || M. Schwartz, P. R. Holvorcem ||  || align=right | 3.0 km || 
|-id=947 bgcolor=#d6d6d6
| 545947 ||  || — || October 24, 2011 || Haleakala || Pan-STARRS || Tj (2.94) || align=right | 3.4 km || 
|-id=948 bgcolor=#d6d6d6
| 545948 ||  || — || October 3, 2011 || Piszkesteto || K. Sárneczky ||  || align=right | 3.6 km || 
|-id=949 bgcolor=#E9E9E9
| 545949 ||  || — || November 16, 2002 || Palomar || NEAT ||  || align=right | 2.1 km || 
|-id=950 bgcolor=#d6d6d6
| 545950 ||  || — || February 12, 2008 || Mount Lemmon || Mount Lemmon Survey ||  || align=right | 3.0 km || 
|-id=951 bgcolor=#E9E9E9
| 545951 ||  || — || October 19, 2011 || Palomar || PTF ||  || align=right | 2.3 km || 
|-id=952 bgcolor=#d6d6d6
| 545952 ||  || — || August 31, 2005 || Palomar || NEAT ||  || align=right | 3.2 km || 
|-id=953 bgcolor=#d6d6d6
| 545953 ||  || — || October 19, 2011 || Mount Lemmon || Mount Lemmon Survey ||  || align=right | 2.7 km || 
|-id=954 bgcolor=#d6d6d6
| 545954 ||  || — || October 24, 2011 || Haleakala || Pan-STARRS ||  || align=right | 1.8 km || 
|-id=955 bgcolor=#E9E9E9
| 545955 ||  || — || June 16, 2010 || Mount Lemmon || Mount Lemmon Survey ||  || align=right | 1.2 km || 
|-id=956 bgcolor=#fefefe
| 545956 ||  || — || October 25, 2011 || Haleakala || Pan-STARRS ||  || align=right data-sort-value="0.53" | 530 m || 
|-id=957 bgcolor=#d6d6d6
| 545957 ||  || — || October 26, 2011 || Haleakala || Pan-STARRS ||  || align=right | 3.6 km || 
|-id=958 bgcolor=#d6d6d6
| 545958 ||  || — || January 16, 2013 || ESA OGS || ESA OGS ||  || align=right | 2.6 km || 
|-id=959 bgcolor=#d6d6d6
| 545959 ||  || — || February 8, 2008 || Mount Lemmon || Mount Lemmon Survey ||  || align=right | 2.6 km || 
|-id=960 bgcolor=#d6d6d6
| 545960 ||  || — || July 11, 2016 || Haleakala || Pan-STARRS ||  || align=right | 2.3 km || 
|-id=961 bgcolor=#d6d6d6
| 545961 ||  || — || August 30, 2016 || Mount Lemmon || Mount Lemmon Survey ||  || align=right | 3.2 km || 
|-id=962 bgcolor=#d6d6d6
| 545962 ||  || — || April 7, 2014 || Mount Lemmon || Mount Lemmon Survey ||  || align=right | 3.0 km || 
|-id=963 bgcolor=#d6d6d6
| 545963 ||  || — || October 24, 2011 || Haleakala || Pan-STARRS ||  || align=right | 2.5 km || 
|-id=964 bgcolor=#d6d6d6
| 545964 ||  || — || October 20, 2011 || Mount Lemmon || Mount Lemmon Survey ||  || align=right | 2.3 km || 
|-id=965 bgcolor=#d6d6d6
| 545965 ||  || — || October 25, 2011 || Haleakala || Pan-STARRS ||  || align=right | 3.1 km || 
|-id=966 bgcolor=#d6d6d6
| 545966 ||  || — || October 27, 2011 || Mount Lemmon || Mount Lemmon Survey ||  || align=right | 2.4 km || 
|-id=967 bgcolor=#d6d6d6
| 545967 ||  || — || April 10, 2014 || Haleakala || Pan-STARRS ||  || align=right | 2.9 km || 
|-id=968 bgcolor=#d6d6d6
| 545968 ||  || — || December 15, 2006 || Kitt Peak || Spacewatch ||  || align=right | 2.1 km || 
|-id=969 bgcolor=#d6d6d6
| 545969 ||  || — || January 29, 2014 || Kitt Peak || Spacewatch ||  || align=right | 2.7 km || 
|-id=970 bgcolor=#d6d6d6
| 545970 ||  || — || October 17, 2011 || Kitt Peak || Spacewatch ||  || align=right | 2.8 km || 
|-id=971 bgcolor=#d6d6d6
| 545971 ||  || — || October 18, 2011 || Mount Lemmon || Mount Lemmon Survey ||  || align=right | 2.9 km || 
|-id=972 bgcolor=#C2FFFF
| 545972 ||  || — || January 3, 2017 || Haleakala || Pan-STARRS || L5 || align=right | 7.9 km || 
|-id=973 bgcolor=#fefefe
| 545973 ||  || — || October 25, 2011 || Haleakala || Pan-STARRS ||  || align=right data-sort-value="0.68" | 680 m || 
|-id=974 bgcolor=#d6d6d6
| 545974 ||  || — || October 23, 2017 || Mount Lemmon || Mount Lemmon Survey ||  || align=right | 2.9 km || 
|-id=975 bgcolor=#d6d6d6
| 545975 ||  || — || October 25, 2011 || Haleakala || Pan-STARRS ||  || align=right | 2.5 km || 
|-id=976 bgcolor=#d6d6d6
| 545976 ||  || — || January 7, 2014 || Mount Lemmon || Mount Lemmon Survey || 7:4 || align=right | 2.8 km || 
|-id=977 bgcolor=#E9E9E9
| 545977 ||  || — || October 22, 2011 || Mount Lemmon || Mount Lemmon Survey ||  || align=right | 1.1 km || 
|-id=978 bgcolor=#d6d6d6
| 545978 ||  || — || March 6, 2014 || ESA OGS || ESA OGS ||  || align=right | 2.5 km || 
|-id=979 bgcolor=#fefefe
| 545979 ||  || — || September 27, 2011 || Les Engarouines || L. Bernasconi ||  || align=right data-sort-value="0.82" | 820 m || 
|-id=980 bgcolor=#fefefe
| 545980 ||  || — || October 14, 2004 || Palomar || NEAT ||  || align=right data-sort-value="0.85" | 850 m || 
|-id=981 bgcolor=#FA8072
| 545981 ||  || — || May 6, 2006 || Mount Lemmon || Mount Lemmon Survey ||  || align=right data-sort-value="0.55" | 550 m || 
|-id=982 bgcolor=#d6d6d6
| 545982 ||  || — || November 1, 2011 || Mount Lemmon || Mount Lemmon Survey ||  || align=right | 2.8 km || 
|-id=983 bgcolor=#d6d6d6
| 545983 ||  || — || October 25, 2011 || Haleakala || Pan-STARRS ||  || align=right | 2.9 km || 
|-id=984 bgcolor=#fefefe
| 545984 ||  || — || September 28, 2011 || Mount Lemmon || Mount Lemmon Survey ||  || align=right data-sort-value="0.75" | 750 m || 
|-id=985 bgcolor=#fefefe
| 545985 ||  || — || November 3, 2011 || Zelenchukskaya Stn || T. V. Kryachko, B. Satovski ||  || align=right data-sort-value="0.64" | 640 m || 
|-id=986 bgcolor=#fefefe
| 545986 ||  || — || October 18, 2011 || Mount Lemmon || Mount Lemmon Survey ||  || align=right data-sort-value="0.56" | 560 m || 
|-id=987 bgcolor=#d6d6d6
| 545987 ||  || — || October 22, 2011 || Kitt Peak || Spacewatch ||  || align=right | 2.3 km || 
|-id=988 bgcolor=#fefefe
| 545988 ||  || — || October 31, 2011 || Kitt Peak || Spacewatch ||  || align=right data-sort-value="0.60" | 600 m || 
|-id=989 bgcolor=#d6d6d6
| 545989 ||  || — || August 25, 2005 || Campo Imperatore || A. Boattini ||  || align=right | 1.9 km || 
|-id=990 bgcolor=#d6d6d6
| 545990 ||  || — || September 29, 2006 || Anderson Mesa || LONEOS ||  || align=right | 2.9 km || 
|-id=991 bgcolor=#d6d6d6
| 545991 ||  || — || November 1, 2011 || Mount Lemmon || Mount Lemmon Survey ||  || align=right | 4.0 km || 
|-id=992 bgcolor=#fefefe
| 545992 ||  || — || August 15, 2014 || Haleakala || Pan-STARRS ||  || align=right data-sort-value="0.63" | 630 m || 
|-id=993 bgcolor=#d6d6d6
| 545993 ||  || — || April 30, 2014 || Haleakala || Pan-STARRS ||  || align=right | 3.2 km || 
|-id=994 bgcolor=#d6d6d6
| 545994 ||  || — || September 30, 2017 || Haleakala || Pan-STARRS ||  || align=right | 2.3 km || 
|-id=995 bgcolor=#d6d6d6
| 545995 ||  || — || November 16, 2011 || Mount Lemmon || Mount Lemmon Survey ||  || align=right | 2.9 km || 
|-id=996 bgcolor=#d6d6d6
| 545996 ||  || — || April 29, 2009 || Mount Lemmon || Mount Lemmon Survey ||  || align=right | 2.8 km || 
|-id=997 bgcolor=#d6d6d6
| 545997 ||  || — || October 30, 2011 || Kitt Peak || Spacewatch ||  || align=right | 2.7 km || 
|-id=998 bgcolor=#fefefe
| 545998 ||  || — || November 3, 2011 || Kitt Peak || Spacewatch ||  || align=right data-sort-value="0.63" | 630 m || 
|-id=999 bgcolor=#d6d6d6
| 545999 ||  || — || October 24, 2005 || Palomar || NEAT ||  || align=right | 4.2 km || 
|-id=000 bgcolor=#d6d6d6
| 546000 ||  || — || May 13, 2009 || Kitt Peak || Spacewatch ||  || align=right | 3.2 km || 
|}

References

External links 
 Discovery Circumstances: Numbered Minor Planets (545001)–(550000) (IAU Minor Planet Center)

0545